= Genetic resources conservation and sustainable use =

Genetic resources conservation

Genetic resources means genetic material of actual or potential value where genetic material means any material of plant, animal, microbial or other origin containing functional units of heredity... Genetic resources thus refer to the part of genetic diversity that has or could have practical use, such as in plant breeding. The term was introduced by Otto Frankel and Erna Bennett for a technical conference on the exploration, utilization and conservation of plant genetic resources, organized by the Food and Agriculture Organisation (FAO) and the International Biological Program (IBP), held in Rome, Italy, 18–26 September 1967.

Genetic resources is one of the three levels of biodiversity defined by Article 2 of the Convention on Biological Diversity (CBD) in Rio, 1992

Under the CBD, discussions and negotiations regarding genetic resources are organized by the FAO Commission of Genetic Resources for Food and Agriculture. This commission distinguishes the following domains of genetic resources:

- Animal genetic resources
- Aquatic genetic resources
- Forest genetic resources
- Micro-organisms and invertebrates
- Plant genetic resources

Genetic resources are threatened by genetic erosion and conservation activities are undertaken to prevent loss of diversity.

== History ==
Before the introduction of the term, the Russian scientist Nikolai Vavilov initiated comprehensive studies on plant genetic resources and conservation work in the 1920’s. The American botanist Jack Harlan stressed the tight link between plant genetic resources and man in a seminal publication "Crops and Man".

== Methodologies for conservation of genetic resources ==
There are two complementary ways to conserve genetics resources:

- in situ, which consists in managing populations on-site, dynamically evolving in their natural environment. In situ methodologies include:
  - conservation in natural populations (in nature)
  - on farm conservation
- ex situ, which consists in conserving individuals or populations out of their natural environments. Ex situ gene bank methodologies include:
  - conservation in seed banks
  - in vitro conservation
  - cryopreservation

== International policies ==
Policies are key to ensure the fair and equitable sharing of benefits derived from the use of genetic resources, for present and future generations. The main international policy framework that regulates genetic resources exchange and use is the Nagoya Protocol which entered into force in 2014. It defines and protects the owners of genetic resources and it sets the rules for Access and Benefit Sharing (ABS)

== Peer-reviewed literature ==
The following scientific journals are dedicated to the topic of genetic resources conservation and sustainable use:

- Conservation Genetics Resources
- Conservation Genetics
- Genetic resources (open access)
- Journal of Genetic Resources
- Plant Genetic Resources
- Genetic Resources and Crop Evolution

== See also ==
- Germplasm, genetic resources that are preserved for various purposes such as breeding, preservation, and research
- International Treaty on Plant Genetic Resources for Food and Agriculture, an international agreement to promote sustainable use of the world's plant genetic resources
- Genetic resources contribute to the provisioning ecosystem services.
