= National Centre for Plant Genetic Resources: Polish Genebank =

Polish research unit

The National Centre for Plant Genetic Resources: Polish Genebank (NCPGR) is a research unit in the Plant Breeding and Acclimatization Institute – National Research Institute. NCPGR is the coordinator and implementer of the National Crop Plant Genetic Resources Protection Programme. The Programme aims to protect the biodiversity of crop plants endangered by genetic erosion in Poland, and is funded by the Ministry of Agriculture. The main tasks include collection of crop and wild plant populations and varieties threatened by genetic erosion, description and evaluation of collected materials, and preservation of their viability and genetic purity. The Programme is an implementation of provisions laid down in international treaties ratified by Poland:

- Convention on Biological Diversity (CBD),
- International Treaty on Plant Genetic Resources for Food and Agriculture (ITPGRFA),
- 2nd Agreement on Government Procurement (GPA).

== Objectives ==
NCPGR collects populations and cultivated varieties of crop and wild plants threatened with genetic erosion. Collected materials are characterised, evaluated and documented.

Seed samples and clones are maintained in viable state and genetic purity. NCPGR exchanges samples with other institutions worldwide and provides initial plant materials for breeding and research programs.

== Organizational structure ==
=== Laboratory for Plants Collection and Evaluation ===
The Laboratory organizes collecting expeditions, during which plant genetic resources are obtained. Plants are collected from natural sites or obtained from farmers or on local markets. Collected material is reproduced and stored in a gene bank. The Laboratory also carries out studies of variation and genetic structure of selected species and prepares initial materials of selected species for practical breeding.

=== Laboratory for Documentation and Seeds Long-term Storage ===
The Laboratory covers drawing up documentation of genetic resources of crop plants and exchanges information with other genebanks. It also obtains seed samples of crop plants from national and international breeding centres. As for the long-term conservation, seed samples need to be prepared and have their viability tested before they are stored in temperature controlled chambers. NCPGR has three long-term storage chambers (-18 °C) and five medium-term storage chambers (0 °C).

The seeds exposed to long-term preservation are tested for viability and biochemical changes. Seed samples with low seed viability or with insufficient seed amount are forwarded for regeneration. The Laboratory provides seed samples for breeding, research and education.

=== Laboratory for Soil Reclamation Plants ===
The Laboratory searches for and collects local and foreign plant species with increased ability to adapt to extreme conditions of devastated environment. Another objective is regeneration and maintenance of viability of alternative plant collection for reclamation of devastated lands and lands periodically excluded from agricultural use.

Selected plant species are analyzed for having the ability to colonize different types of industrial and communal derivative areas. There is also description of morphological and other useful plant traits carried out when it comes to plants which have high biological yielding potential to serve as a source of energy and for other economic uses.

The Laboratory prepares initial material for the breeding programmes of alternative crops.

=== Botanical Garden in Bydgoszcz ===
The key activity of Botanical Garden is evaluation and preservation of grass genetic resources. The plants originated from various climatic zones are maintained in different, highly specialized collections. Natural resources of Botanical Garden include:

- grass species collection,
- energetic plants collection,
- plants that are usable for breeding purposes collection,
- reclamation plants collection.

== See also ==
- Agricultural biodiversity
- Biodiversity
- Conservation genetics
- Neglected and underutilized crop
