= In-situ conservation =

Conservation process

In-situ conservation is the on-site conservation or the conservation of genetic resources in natural populations of plant or animal species, such as forest genetic resources in natural populations of tree species. This process protects the inhabitants and ensures the sustainability of the environment and ecosystem.

Its converse is ex situ conservation, where threatened species are moved to another location. These can include places like seed libraries, gene banks and more where they are protected through human intervention.

== Methods ==
=== Nature reserves ===
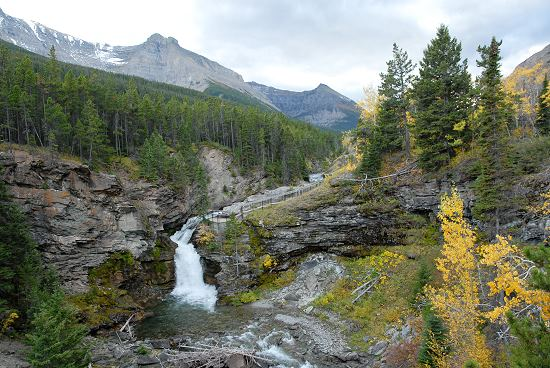
Waterton Biosphere Reserve in Canada

Nature reserves (or biosphere reserves) cover very large areas, often more than 5,000 km^{2} (1,900 sq mi). They are used to protect species for a long time. There are three different classifications for these reserves:

- Strict Natural Areas
- Managed Natural Areas
- Wilderness Areas

Strict natural areas are created to protect the state of nature in a given region. It is not made for the purpose of protecting any species within its limits. Managed natural areas alternatively are made specifically for the purpose of protecting a certain species or community that is at the point it may be at risk being in a strict natural area. This is a more controlled environment that is created to be the most optimal habitat for the species concerned to thrive. Finally, a wilderness area serves a dual purpose of providing a protection for the natural region as well as providing recreational opportunities for patrons (excluding motorized transport).

=== National parks ===
A national park is an area dedicated for the conservation of wildlife along with its environment. A national park is an area which is used to conserve scenery, natural and historical objects. It is usually a small reserve covering an area of about 100 to 500 km^{2} (40 to 200 sq mi). Within biosphere reserves, one or more national parks may also exist.

=== Wildlife sanctuaries ===
Wildlife sanctuaries can provide a higher quality of life for animals who are moved there. These animals are placed in specialized habitats that allows for more species-specific behaviors to take place. Wildlife sanctuaries are often used for animals that have been in zoos, circuses, laboratories and more for a long time, and then live the rest of their lives with greater autonomy in these habitats.

=== Biodiversity hotspots ===
Biodiversity hotspots across the world

Several international organizations focus their conservation work on areas designated as biodiversity hotspots.

According to Conservation International, to qualify as a biodiversity hotspot a region must meet two strict criteria:

- it must contain at least 1,500 species of vascular plants (∆ 0.5% of the world's total) as endemics,
- it has to have lost at least 70% of its original habitat.

Biodiversity hotspots make up 1.4% of the earth's land area, yet they contain more than half of our planets species.

=== Gene sanctuary ===
A gene sanctuary is an area where plants are conserved. It includes both biosphere reserves as well as national parks. Biosphere reserves are developed to be both a place for biodiversity conservation as well as sustainable development. The concept was first developed in the 1970s and include a core, buffer and transition zones. These zones act together to harmonize the conservation and development aspects of the biosphere.

Since 2004, and 30 years following the invention of the biosphere reserve concept, there have been about 459 conservation areas developed in 97 countries.

== Benefits ==
One benefit of in situ conservation is that it maintains recovering populations in the environment where they have developed their distinctive properties. Another benefit is that this strategy helps ensure the ongoing processes of evolution and adaptation within their environments. As a last resort, ex situ conservation may be used on some or all of the population, when in situ conservation is too difficult, or impossible. The species gets adjusted to the natural disasters like drought, floods, forest fires and this method is very cheap and convenient.

== Reserves ==
Wildlife and livestock conservation involves the protection of wildlife habitats. Sufficiently large reserves must be maintained to enable the target species to exist in large numbers. The population size must be sufficient to enable the necessary genetic diversity to survive, so that it has a good chance of continuing to adapt and evolve over time. This reserve size can be calculated for target species by examining the population density in naturally occurring situations. The reserves must then be protected from intrusion or destruction by man, and against other catastrophes.

== Agriculture ==
In agriculture, in situ conservation techniques are an effective way to improve, maintain, and use traditional or native varieties of agricultural crops. Such methodologies link the positive output of scientific research with farmers' experience and field work.

First, the accessions of a variety stored at a germplasm bank and those of the same variety multiplied by farmers are jointly tested in the producers field and in the laboratory, under different situations and stresses. Thus, the scientific knowledge about the production characteristics of the native varieties is enhanced. Later, the best tested accessions are crossed, mixed, and multiplied under replicable situations. At last, these improved accessions are supplied to the producers. Thus, farmers are enabled to crop improved selections of their own varieties, instead of being lured to substitute their own varieties with commercial ones or to abandon their crop. This technique of conservation of agricultural biodiversity is more successful in marginal areas, where commercial varieties are not expedient, due to climate and soil fertility constraints, or where the taste and cooking characteristics of traditional varieties compensate for their lower yields.

== In India ==
About 4% of the total geographical area of India is used for in situ conservation.

There are 18 biosphere reserves in India, including Nanda Devi in Uttarakhand, Nokrek in Meghalaya, Manas National Park in Assam and Sundarban in West Bengal.

There are 106 national parks in India, including The Kaziranga National Park which conserves The one-horned rhino, Periyar National Park conserving the tiger and elephant, and Ranthambore National Park conserving the tiger.

There are 551 wildlife sanctuaries in India.

Biodiversity hotspots include the Himalayas, the Western Ghats, the Indo-Burma region and the Sundaland.

India has set up its first gene sanctuary in the Garo Hills of Meghalaya for wild relatives of citrus. Efforts are also being made to set up gene sanctuaries for banana, sugarcane, rice and mango.

Community reserves were established as a type of protected area in India in the Wildlife Protection Amendment Act 2002, to provide legal support to community or privately owned reserves which cannot be designated as national park or wildlife sanctuary.

Sacred groves are tracts of forest set aside where all the trees and wildlife within are venerated and given total protection.

== In China ==
China has up to 2538 nature reserves covering 15% of the country.

The majority of in situ conservation areas are concentrated in the regions of Tibet, Qinghai, and Xinjiang. These provinces, all in western China, account for about 56% of the country's nature reserves.

Eastern and southern China contain 90% of the country's population, and there are few nature reserves in these areas. In these regions, nature reserves actively compete with human development projects to support a growing demand for infrastructure. One consequence of this competing development has been the movement of the South China tiger out of its natural habitat.

In eastern and southern China, many undeveloped natural landscapes are fragmented; however, nature reserves may provide crucial refuge for key species and ecosystem services.

== See also ==
- Arid Forest Research Institute
- Biodiversity
- Food plot – the practice of planting crops specifically to support wildlife
- Genetic erosion
- Habitat corridor
- Habitat fragmentation
- Refuge (ecology)
- Reintroduction
- Regional Red List
- Restoration ecology
- Wildlife corridor
