= S.N. Sundarambal =

Indian freedom fighter (1913–2007)

S. N. Sundarambal (7 October 1913, in Tiruppur – 20 August 2007, in Tiruppur) was an Indian freedom fighter and social activist, best remembered for organising various demonstrations against the British Raj which led to her arrests, most notably after a Satyagraha protest, serving a three-month sentence at the Vellore prison in 1941. She was a follower of Mahatma Gandhi and Vinobha Bhave, and participated in the Khadi movement during the Indian freedom struggle. After Indian independence, she advocated for farmers' rights, and founded the Angeripalayam orphanage in Tiruppur.
