= Conservation Genetics (journal) =

- Discipline: Conservation genetics
- Language: English
- Edited by: A. Rus Hoelzel

Publication details
- History: 2000–present
- Publisher: Springer Science+Business Media
- Frequency: Bimonthly
- Impact factor: 2.040 (2015)

Standard abbreviations
- ISO 4: Conserv. Genet.

Indexing
- CODEN: CGOEAC
- ISSN: 1566-0621 (print); 1572-9737 (web)
- OCLC no.: 46805085

Links
- Journal homepage; Online archive

Conservation Genetics is a bimonthly peer-reviewed scientific journal covering all areas of conservation genetics. It was originally established in 2000 by Kluwer Academic Publishers, and is currently published by Springer Science+Business Media. The editor-in-chief is A. Rus Hoelzel (University of Durham). According to the Journal Citation Reports, the journal has a 2022 impact factor of 2.2

== See also ==
- Conservation Genetics Resources
