= Transboundary breed =

A transboundary breed is a breed which is present in several countries, compared to a local breed which is present in just one country. A regional transboundary breed is one that occurs only in one of the seven SoW-AnGR regions (Note: SoW-AnGR = State of the World - Animal Genetic Resources)—Africa, Asia, Europe and the Caucases, Latin America and the Caribbean, Near and Middle East, North America, and South West Pacific. An international transboundary breed is one that occurs in more than one region.

Some breeds of the five most significant livestock species (cattle, sheep, goats, pigs and chickens) have been developed for a hundred years or more in intensive agricultural systems, and have spread beyond their local areas—some have spread globally. Just a small number of these international transboundary breeds represent a large share of the total global animal products. Local breeds have adapted to local conditions and are most appropriate for small-scale farming operations. The transboundary breeds often require intensive production systems, and require high levels of modern inputs and technologies. Only in North America and the South West Pacific do the number of transboundary breeds surpass that of local breeds.

== See also ==
- Native species
- Landrace
- Animal genetic resources for food and agriculture
- Agricultural biodiversity
- DAD-IS (Domestic Animal Diversity Information System)
