= DAD-IS =

International animal genetic resources programme

FAO logo

DAD-IS is the acronym for the Domestic Animal Diversity Information System, a tool developed and maintained by the Food and Agriculture Organization of the United Nations as a part of its programme for management of animal genetic resources for food and agriculture. It includes a searchable database of information on animal breeds.

== Overview ==
The FAO began to collect data on animal breeds in 1982. The first version of DAD-IS was launched in 1996 and the software has been updated several times; the fourth version was launched in 2017.

DAD-IS includes a searchable database of information about animal breeds, the Global Databank for Animal Genetic Resources. It contains information on breed characteristics, uses, geographic distribution and demographics; more than 4000 images; and tools for generating user-defined reports; and has a multilingual interface and content. It also provides contact information for the national and regional coordinators for the programme. Data is collected and entered by each country's National Coordinator via web-based data-entry screens available in several languages.

The data is used for reporting on the global status and trends of animal genetic resources, including the data for indicators 2.5.1b (number of animal genetic resources for food and agriculture secured in either medium- or long-term conservation facilities) and 2.5.2 (proportion of local breeds classified as being at risk of extinction) of the Sustainable Development Goals of the United Nations.

== Breeds in the global databank ==
The database lists breeds of 37 different mammalian and avian livestock species. In September 2022 it held data on 11555 mammalian and 3758 avian national breed populations, representing a global total of 8859 breeds, of which 595 (7%) were reported as extinct. Local breeds (found in only one region) made up 7739 entries, while 1120 were transboundary breeds (found in more than one region).

In 2022 a total of 7153 local breeds were listed – 4954 mammalian and 2199 avian – and 555 transboundary breeds (458 mammalian and 97 avian). (Note: See tables 2–5 in the report)

== Risk status ==
The FAO uses the information about population sizes to classify breeds according to risk of extinction. The risk classes are: "at risk" ("critical", "critical-maintained", "endangered", "endangered-maintained" and "vulnerable"), "not at risk" and "extinct".

Approximately 27% of breeds (about 2350) are either classified as being at risk of extinction or are already extinct. A further 54% are classified as unknown risk status; these include breeds for which no population data has been reported in the last 10 years.
