= The State of the World's Animal Genetic Resources for Food and Agriculture =

Report by the Food and Agriculture Organization of the United Nations in 2007

- Author: Barbara Rischkowsky, Dafydd Pilling (editors)
- Language: English
- Subject: Animal genetic resources for food and agriculture
- Genre: international report
- Published: Rome
- Publisher: Food and Agriculture Organization of the United Nations
- Publication date: 2007
- ISBN: 9789251057629

The State of the World's Animal Genetic Resources for Food and Agriculture is a major report on the genetic resources of breeds of farm livestock in the world. It was published by the Food and Agriculture Organization of the United Nations (FAO) in 2007. It covers mammalian and avian domestic livestock breeds, but does not include fish, honey bees or other invertebrates. It is based on information submitted to the FAO, in the form of reports of participating countries, thematic studies prepared by experts and data on individual breeds submitted to DAD-IS. An annex to the report, the List of breeds documented in the Global Databank for Animal Genetic Resources, gives an estimate of conservation status for all breeds for which sufficient data had been received. The report has been translated into Arabic, Chinese, French, Indonesian, Russian and Spanish.

In 2015 a second edition of the report, The Second Report on the State of the World's Animal Genetic Resources, was published. The second report emphasizes changes in the status and management of animal genetic resources for food and agriculture that occurred in the eight-year period following the publication of the original version. The second report has been translated into Chinese.
