= Forest genetic resources =

Genetic material of trees and shrubs

Forest genetic resources or forest tree genetic resources are genetic resources (i.e., genetic material of actual or future value) of forest shrub and tree species. Forest genetic resources are essential for forest-depending communities who rely for a substantial part of their livelihoods on timber and non-timber forest products (for example fruits, gums and resins) for food security, domestic use and income generation. These resources are also the basis for large-scale wood production in planted forests to satisfy the worldwide need for timber and paper. Genetic resources of several important timber, fruit and other non-timber tree species are conserved ex situ in genebanks or maintained in field collections. Nevertheless, in situ conservation in forests and on farms is in the case of most tree species the most important measure to protect their genetic resources.

== Understanding diversity ==
A better understanding of the diversity of these species is crucial for their sustainable use and conservation. Monitoring patterns of distribution and genetic diversity of these species allows the prioritization of populations for in situ conservation, identification of populations and species most at risk and existing gaps in genebank collections. This is vital information which helps tackle global challenges such as food security and climate change.

== The State of the World's Forest Genetic Resources ==
In 2014, the Food and Agriculture Organization of the United Nations published the first State of the World's Forest Genetic Resources. The publication addressed the conservation, management and sustainable use of forest tree and other woody plant genetic resources of actual and potential value for human well-being in the broad range of management systems. It was prepared based on information provided by 86 countries, outcomes from regional and subregional consultations, and commissioned thematic studies. Amongst the ten key findings, half of the forest species reported as regularly utilized by countries are threatened by the conversion of forests to pastures and farmland, overexploitation, and the impacts of climate change.

On the basis of the information and knowledge compiled by FAO for The State of World's Forest Genetic Resources, the Commission on Genetic Resources for Food and Agriculture developed the Global Plan of Action for the Conservation, Sustainable Use and Development of Forest Genetic Resources.

This Global Plan of Action identifies 27 strategic priorities grouped into 4 areas:

1. improving the availability of, and access to, information on forest genetic resources;
2. conservation of forest genetic resources (in situ and ex situ)
3. sustainable use, development and management of forest genetic resources
4. policies, institutions and capacity-building.

== Forest genetic resources and climate change ==
Even though this is a field with many uncertainties, it is evident that during the next 50–100 years climate changes will have an effect on the distribution of forest tree species and the composition of forests. Diversity of forest genetic resources enables the potential for a species (or a population) to adapt to climatic changes and related future challenges such as temperature changes, drought, pests, diseases and forest fires. Though forest trees are known for showing great plasticity in their response to climate changes, not all species are naturally capable to adapt at the pace necessary. For that reason human interventions, such as transfer of forest reproductive material, may be needed. This is particular important for rare and scattered distributed species and species found on the edge of its distribution range.

== See also ==
- Environmental DNA
- Plant genetic resources
