= Conservation Genetics Resources =

- Discipline: Conservation genetics
- Language: English
- Edited by: Benoit Goossens

Publication details
- History: 2009–present
- Publisher: Springer Science+Business Media
- Frequency: Quarterly
- Impact factor: 0.446 (2015)

Standard abbreviations
- ISO 4: Conserv. Genet. Resour.

Indexing
- ISSN: 1877-7260

Links
- Journal homepage; Online archive

Conservation Genetics Resources is a quarterly peer-reviewed scientific journal covering methodological improvements, computer programs, and the development of genomic resources related to conservation genetics. It was established in 2009 and is published by Springer Science+Business Media. The editor-in-chief is Benoit Goossens (Cardiff University). According to the Journal Citation Reports, the journal has a 2015 impact factor of 0.446.

== See also ==
- Conservation Genetics
