= Genetic erosion =

Genetic phenomenon

Genetic erosion (also known as genetic depletion or genomic erosion) is any decrease in genetic diversity, both naturally occurring and human-caused. The term is sometimes used in a narrow sense, such as when describing the loss of particular alleles or genes, as well as being used more broadly when referring to the loss of a phenotype or whole species.

Genetic erosion occurs because each individual organism has a unique genome. If the individual dies without the chance to breed, any unique genes they carry are lost before they can be passed down to offspring. Two factors that compound and accelerate genetic erosion are habitat loss and habitat fragmentation—often brought on by development of agricultural and infrastructural areas—and low genetic diversity. Low genetic diversity is linked to inbreeding and a weak immune system both of which can then "fast-track" that species towards eventual extinction.

By definition, endangered species suffer varying degrees of genetic erosion. Many species benefit from a human-assisted breeding program to keep their population viable, thereby avoiding extinction over long time-frames. Small populations are more susceptible to genetic erosion than larger populations.

The gene pool of a species or a population is the complete set of unique alleles that would be found by inspecting the genetic material of every living member of that species or population. A large gene pool indicates extensive genetic diversity, which is associated with robust populations that can survive bouts of intense selection. Meanwhile, low genetic diversity (see inbreeding and population bottlenecks) can cause reduced biological fitness and increase the chance of extinction of that species or population.

== Causes of genetic erosion ==
With genetic erosion being a broad concept, there are several ways in which it can occur. Most tie back to the loss of individuals in a population and therefore a loss of their specific set of alleles. In large numbers, this is referred to as a population bottleneck—caused by various events including human activity and natural disasters–which greatly shrinks the gene pool and leaves fewer and fewer fertile mating pairs.

In addition to being a direct cause, population size also increases the likelihood of genetic erosion with smaller populations being at higher risk. For example, if an individual in a population dies, the chances of the alleles it carried appearing elsewhere in the population are greater in a larger population. Another contributing factor is restriction of gene flow. Without an appropriate amount of dispersal between populations, small occurrences of genetic erosion within one population may be difficult to bounce back from.

All of these factors came into play for one commonly studied example of genetic erosion: the Ngorongoro Crater lions. High prey density is limited to within the crater due to human activity in the surrounding areas. This creates a barrier that prevents dispersal and limits gene flow. The population of lions also experienced several bottlenecks in the last several hundred years both by hunting and disease. Most notably was an epizootic outbreak that reduced the population to only 15 individuals in 1962. These circumstances greatly reduced the genetic diversity within the population leading to various consequences.

== Consequences to populations and individuals ==
The consequences of genetic erosion can be drastic and eventually lead to extinction of a population or even a whole species. When the genetic diversity of a population or individual decreases, there is less to work with when facing biological and environmental threats. For example, if a population is hit with a novel disease, it is less likely that some individuals can survive or be immune if there is less genetic diversity in the population. The effects on the populations immunity are also affected by inbreeding; A mechanism that exposes deleterious recessive traits and is heightened in small populations suffering from low genetic diversity. Individuals can become more vulnerable to various threats of disease therefore exposing the population to a fatal epidemic. Inbreeding also increases the chances of both physical and reproductive congenital defects. When the likelihood of having abnormal sperm increases, infertility rates increase, and birthrates decline. With these various effects combined, populations both have lower birth rates and newly born individuals with lower individual fitness. Have individuals with lower fitness makes the population vulnerable to environmental stresses that it would normally be able to bounce back from under healthy circumstances.

== Drivers in the loss of agricultural and livestock biodiversity ==
Genetic erosion in agricultural and livestock is the loss of biological genetic diversity—including the loss of individual genes, and the loss of particular recombinants of genes (or gene complexes)—such as those manifested in locally adapted landraces of domesticated animals or plants that have become adapted to the natural environment in which they originated. For agriculture specifically, this can mean any loss of a crop, a variety of a crop, or an allele.

The major driving forces behind genetic erosion in crops are variety replacement, land clearing, overexploitation of species, population pressure, environmental degradation, overgrazing, governmental policy, and changing agricultural systems. The main factor, however, is the replacement of local varieties of domestic plants and animals by other varieties or species that are non-local. A large number of varieties can also often be dramatically reduced when commercial varieties are introduced into traditional farming systems. Many researchers believe that the main problem related to agro-ecosystem management is the general tendency towards genetic and ecological uniformity imposed by the development of modern agriculture.

In the case of Animal Genetic Resources for Food and Agriculture, major causes of genetic erosion are reported to include indiscriminate cross-breeding, increased use of exotic breeds, weak policies and institutions in animal genetic resources management, neglect of certain breeds because of a lack of profitability or competitiveness, the intensification of production systems, the effects of diseases and disease management, loss of pastures or other elements of the production environment, and poor control of inbreeding.

== Prevention by human intervention, modern science and safeguards ==
=== In situ conservation ===
With advances in modern bioscience, several techniques and safeguards have emerged to check the relentless advance of genetic erosion and the resulting acceleration of endangered species towards eventual extinction. However, many of these techniques and safeguards are too expensive yet to be practical, and so the best way to protect species is to protect their habitat and to let them live in it as naturally as possible. Complicating matters, the conservation of substantial amounts of genetic diversity often requires the maintenance of multiple independent populations across a species distribution. For example, to conserve at least 90% of the genetic diversity of the northern quoll requires the conservation of at least eight populations across the continent of Australia.

Wildlife sanctuaries and national parks have been created to preserve entire ecosystems with all the web of species native to the area. Wildlife corridors are created to join fragmented habitats (see Habitat fragmentation) to enable endangered species to travel, meet, and breed with others of their kind. Scientific conservation and modern wildlife management techniques, with the expertise of scientifically trained staff, help manage these protected ecosystems and the wildlife found in them. Wild animals are also translocated and reintroduced to other locations physically when fragmented wildlife habitats are too far and isolated to be able to link together via a wildlife corridor, or when local extinctions have already occurred.

=== Ex situ conservation ===
Modern policies of zoo associations and zoos around the world have begun putting dramatically increased emphasis on keeping and breeding wild-sourced species and subspecies of animals in their registered endangered species breeding programs. These specimens are intended to have a chance to be reintroduced and survive in the wild. The main objectives of zoos today have changed, and greater resources are being invested in breeding species and subspecies for the ultimate purpose of assisting conservation efforts in the wild. Zoos do this by maintaining extremely detailed scientific breeding records (i.e. studbooks) and by loaning their wild animals to other zoos around the country (and often globally) for breeding, to safeguard against inbreeding by attempting to maximize genetic diversity however possible.

Costly (and sometimes controversial) ex situ conservation techniques aim to increase the genetic biodiversity on our planet, as well as the diversity in local gene pools. by guarding against genetic erosion. Modern concepts like seedbanks, sperm banks, and tissue banks have become much more commonplace and valuable. Sperm, eggs, and embryos can now be frozen and kept in banks, which are sometimes called "Modern Noah's Arks" or "Frozen Zoos". Cryopreservation techniques are used to freeze these living materials and keep them alive in perpetuity by storing them submerged in liquid nitrogen tanks at very low temperatures. Thus, preserved materials can then be used for artificial insemination, in vitro fertilization, embryo transfer, and cloning methodologies to protect diversity in the gene pool of critically endangered species.

Cloning endangered species using preserved tissue samples or genetic material from captive or recently dead animals has also been proposed as a method to prevent extinction. A new specimen can be "resurrected" so as to give it another chance to breed its genes into the living population of the respective threatened species. Currently resurrection of dead critically endangered wildlife specimens with the help of cloning is still being perfected, and is still too expensive to be practical at scale.

== De-extinction and bioethics: restoring biodiversity in the face of genetic erosion ==
De-extinction, also known as resurrection biology, refers to all scientific methods, such as cloning, selective backcrossing, or genetic modification (CRISPR), aimed at bringing extinct species back to life or recreating equivalent organisms, called proxies. This approach is based on restoring genetic material from ancient DNA or from closely related species that still exist, using true resurrection via cloning preserved cells, recreation of current species to restore the traits of extinct species, or ecological reconstitution consisting of introducing an equivalent species into an ecosystem. Although this approach can restore lost ecological functions and promote biodiversity, it remains a project associated with various risks such as disease transmission, hybridization, and animal suffering. It is in this context that the International Union for Conservation of Nature (IUCN) published guidelines in 2016 aimed at regulating the creation of substitutes for extinct species. According to this report, the perfect recreation of an extinct species is impossible due to genetic, physiological, or behavioral variations, hence the use of the term "proxy species. Beyond its scientific variability, de-extinction still raises important ethical considerations regarding animal welfare, given that the creation of clones could cause suffering, malformations, abortions, and even premature mortality. It also raises questions about our moral responsibility towards extinct species, believing that we should "restore" them simply to compensate for the damage humans have caused. This practice therefore calls into question human arrogance—the act of "playing God"—because by creating transgenic organisms and reviving damaged species, we will exceed our capacity for control, which raises questions about the moral limits of our actions. However, some authors attempt to downplay this criticism by emphasizing that the motivation may be a sense of guilt or a biocentric concern for restoring nature, rather than excessive pride. In short, de-extinction represents a major ethical challenge, balancing the possibility of restoring lost ecological functions with the need to respect the well-being of individuals and the moral limits of our interventions in nature.

== See also ==
- Vavilov center
- Conservation biology
- Crop wild relative
- Gene bank
- Genetic pollution
- Genetics
- Mutational meltdown
- Neglected and underutilized crops
- Population genetics
