= Osteometry =

Study and measurement of the skeleton

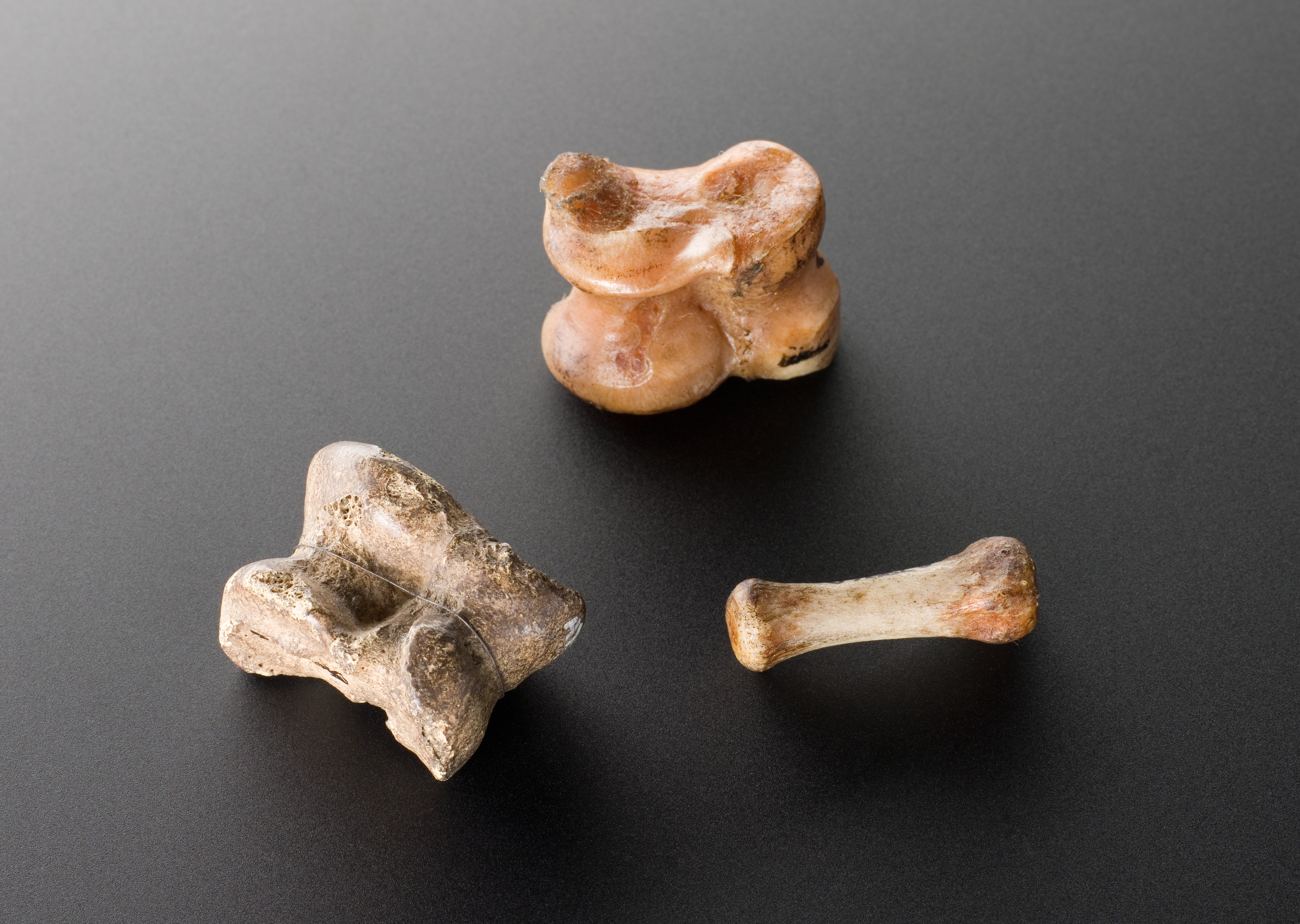
Bone, England, 1870–1909 Wellcome L0057379

Osteometry is the study and measurement of the human or animal skeleton, especially in an anthropological or archaeological context. In archaeology it has been used to various ends in the subdisciplines of zooarchaeology and bioarchaeology.

In zooarchaeology the main goal of osteometry is taxonomic determination and, to a lesser extent, determination of sex. The most useful elements to measure in sex determination are the pelvis and cranium. Usually it is very difficult to discriminate between different species of the same genus or family (e.g., South American camelids), and the statistical analysis of osteometric parameters is quite useful.

In bioarchaeology, osteometry is useful to help answer many anthropological questions about past human populations. For example, it may be used to determine kinship, sex, the degree of sexual dimorphism (which may be used to answer questions related to lack of nutrition), and to some extent ethnicity. Osteometry is also used in the identification of human remains, particularly in commingled assemblages. It is used in addition to DNA analysis for individual identification. There are many problems around the interpretation of osteometric data: loose replicability of the measurements, problems relative to the phenotypic variations between subpopulations of one species, and others.

== Purpose ==
Comparison of various aspects of ancient skeletons can be used to determine which species a skeleton belongs to, or if the differences are vast enough, create a new species. In later skeletons, osteometry has historically been used to attempt to identify the ethnicity or race of skeletons.

Aspects commonly studied in determining the species of very early skeletons include the length of the femur and other long bones, the capacity of the skull, the shape of the facial features and skull, the shape of the jaw and teeth, the curve of the spine, the situation and shape of the pelvis, and the location of the foramen magnum.

== See also ==
- Sinodonty and Sundadonty
