= Otto Frankel =

Austrian geneticist (1900–1998) active in New Zealand and Australia

Sir Otto Herzberg Frankel (4 November 1900, Vienna – 21 November 1998, Canberra) was an Austrian-born New Zealand and Australian geneticist renowned for his pioneering work in plant genetics and conservation. Frankel was among the first scientists in the 1960s and 1970s to raise awareness about the critical importance of preserving plant biodiversity and the risks associated with biodiversity loss. A lot of Frankel's influential work in conservation genetics was done after his retirement, when he became an advocate for genetic resource preservation.

His research and advocacy laid the groundwork for modern conservation genetics, influencing global efforts to protect endangered plant species and ecosystems. Frankel's distinguished career spanned several decades, during which he made significant contributions to both theoretical and applied genetics, earning him numerous accolades, including fellowship in the Royal Society (FRS) and the Australian Academy of Science (FAA). His legacy continues to inspire conservationists and geneticists worldwide.

== Early life and family ==
Otto Herzberg-Frankel was the third of four sons of a prominent and wealthy lawyer. Otto's paternal grandfather, a well-known author, added Herzberg from his mother's name to become Herzberg-Frankel. After his father's death, Otto dropped the hyphen. Ludwig Herzberg-Frankel, Otto's father, was a highly successful barrister in Vienna. He was related to Lewis Namier, who played a significant role in Otto's career.

Max, Otto's oldest brother (1895–1983), qualified in law but after joining Otto in New Zealand in 1938 he became an accountant. Theo (1897–1986), who had to flee Vienna hurriedly in 1938, became a progressive paper manufacturer in Great Britain, establishing the Scottish Pulp and Paper Mills enterprise in the Scottish Highlands. Paul (1903–1992) also moved to Britain, from Poland in 1937. An economist by training, he founded Petroleum Economics Ltd. in 1955 and became a distinguished international authority on the oil industry.

In Otto's early years, his father employed a tutor for his sons as well as a French governess. From 1910 to 1918 Otto attended the Piaristen Staatsgymnasiums Wien VIII, where he met Karl Popper. Otto claimed to have had no education, as this was a classical rather than a modern school, with poor mathematics and next to no science but eight years of Latin and four of Greek. None of his teachers inspired him.

Frankel married twice. His first wife was Mathilde Donsbach (1899–1989). They married in the mid-1920s and divorced in 1937. In 1939, he married Margaret Anderson (1902–1997); the engineer John Anderson was her grandfather. From 1929 to 1951, he was employed at Lincoln College and lived in Christchurch. Otto and Margaret Frankel commissioned the architect Ernst Plischke to design their house in the Christchurch suburb of Opawa; Frankel House is a Category 2 entry on the Heritage New Zealand register.

== Education ==
Looking back on his education, otto recognized that although he developed independence in research, he missed key aspects of university life. His early courses were disorganized, and he often worked alone with little guidance from Baur or his official supervisor, Elizabeth Schiemann. His focus on genetics isolated him from his peers, and he didn't acquire cell biology skills.

== Career ==
Otto worked for two years (1925–1927) as a plant breeder on a large private estate at Dioseg, near Bratislava.

In 1929, he started studying cells of Hebe-Veronica and later suggested changes to their classification. After his visit to the John Innes Horticultural Institution in 1935, his research shifted to Fritillaria.

Some of his best work focused on inverted duplication in wheat, and he also spent years studying base-sterile mutants of speltoid wheats.

Lewis Namier persuaded Otto to emigrate to Palestine to help establish a plant and animal breeding programme there and to act as a bridge between the Zionist Organization and the Empire Marketing Board under the direction of John Boyd Orr. There, Otto began his cytological career by counting the chromosomes of the Jaffa orange. He did not like Palestine and moved to England.

While in New Zealand, Frankel helped advance wheat breeding by developing varieties with better baking quality. The wheat varieties included Cross 7, Taiaroa, Tainui, Fife-Tuscan, WRI-Yielder, and Hilgendorf. Cross 7 especially improved the wheat plants' ability to stand up and helped make farming with machines easier.

He was elected a Fellow of the Royal Society in 1953.

== Conservation of biodiversity ==
Beginning in 1964, Frankel worked as a member of the International Biological Program (IBP) focusing on the issue of genetic resources. ('Genetic resources' is a term coined by Frankel and Erna Bennett after a nearly all night brainstorming session to find a neutral term at the 2nd International Conference (1967) on Crop Plant Exploration and Conservation, FAO, Rome). In this role, he chaired a joint committee of experts the UN Food and Agriculture Organization organised several international conferences, and worked to raise awareness of the issue of biodiversity loss among scientists, the international community, and the public.

== Legacy ==
Otto Frankel is regarded as a pioneer of conservation genetics and the conservation of plant genetic resources. Building on his earlier research, he played a central role in raising global awareness of genetic erosion during the 1960s and 1970s through his work with the IBP and the FAO. At the 1967 FAO/IBP conference on crop plant exploration and conservation, Frankel and Erna Bennet introduced the terms "genetic resources" and "genetic erosion," which became central concepts in the field and keep influencing international conservation policy.

Frankel was also instrumental in bringing genetic conservation into global policy discussions. At the 1972 United Nations Conference on the Human Environment in Stockholm, his recommendations on the conservation of genetic resources were adopted, promoting the recognition of biodiversity loss as an international scientific and political issue.

Frankel's publications helped establish conservation genetics as a field. his 1972 paper, "Genetic conservation: our evolutionary responsibility," is seen as a landmark for explaining the ethical need to protect genetic diversity. His 1981 book, Conservation and Evolution, co-written with Michael E. Soulé, stood out for connecting genetic resource conservation to broader discussions of biodiversity and evolution.

Frankel's influence persisted well beyond retirement. The International Board for Plant Genetic Resources established the Vavilov-Frankel Fellowship Program in recognition of his contributions, and he remained active in resesarch and policy discussions into his nineties. His later works, including The Conservation of Plant Biodiversity (1995), co-authored with Anthony H. D. Brown and Jeremy J. Burdon, continued to shape scientific approaches to biodiversity conservation.
