= Erna Bennett =

Irish botanist

Erna Bennett (1925–2012) was a plant geneticist and one of the early pioneers of genetic conservation (biodiversity conservation). She was one of the first to raise the issue of biodiversity loss at the United Nations.

== Work on plant genetic diversity ==
During the 1960s Bennett worked at the (now-defunct) Scottish Plant Breeding Station, where she studied micro-evolution and the origins of genetic diversity, with a focus on forage and seed crops. Her work included expeditions around the world to collect plant samples.

In 1964 she wrote the internationally influential paper “Plant Introduction and Genetic Conservation: Genecological aspects of an urgent world problem”. In it, she coined the term "genetic resources" to express the idea that genes themselves are a resource - one that has been disappearing rapidly, as diverse traditional peasant seeds have been replaced by uniform modern, elite seeds.

In traditional, peasant crop varieties, or landraces, each plant is a bit different from the others, and this genetic diversity means that when new plant diseases or pests appear, at least some of the plants will likely be resistant. By contrast, in modern pedigree or elite crop varieties each plant is the same, and while these elite crops are often high-yielding, their lack of genetic diversity makes them particularly vulnerable to attacks by new strains of disease. When an elite variety stops giving acceptably high yields due to disease, or some other factor, the plant breeders turn to the traditional varieties, or even to wild relatives, in search of genes that can confer the necessary resistance.

== Work at the FAO on the conservation of plant genetic resources, 1967-1982 ==
Bennett worked at the United Nations Food and Agriculture Organization from 1967 to 1982. During this time she coordinated various programmes of exploration and genetic conservation around the world, and created the world's first survey of crop germplasm collections.

In 1970 she co-wrote with Otto Frankel the classic book on genetic resources “Genetic Resources in Plants”.

In 1971 she was awarded the Meyer Memorial Medal of the FAO.

In 1982 Bennett resigned from the FAO in protest at the influence of corporate interests in the organisation's decision-making processes.

Bennett was one of the founding board members of RAFI, which later became the ETC Group.
