= Animal genetic resources for food and agriculture =

Animal genetic resources for food and agriculture (AnGR), also known as farm animal genetic resources or livestock biodiversity, are genetic resources (i.e., genetic material of actual or potential value) of avian and mammalian species, which are used for food and agriculture purposes. AnGR is a subset of and a specific element of agricultural biodiversity.

AnGR could be embodied in live populations or in conserved genetic materials such as cryoconserved semen or embryos. The diversity of animal genetic resources includes diversity at species, breed and within-breed level. Known are currently 8,800 different breeds of birds and mammals within 38 species used for food and agriculture. The main animal species used for food and agriculture production are cattle, sheep, goats, chickens and pigs. In the livestock world, these species are often referred to as "the big five". Some less-utilized species include the dromedary, donkey, bactrian camel, buffalo, guinea pig, horse, rabbit, yak, goose, duck, ostrich, partridge, pheasant, pigeon, and turkey.

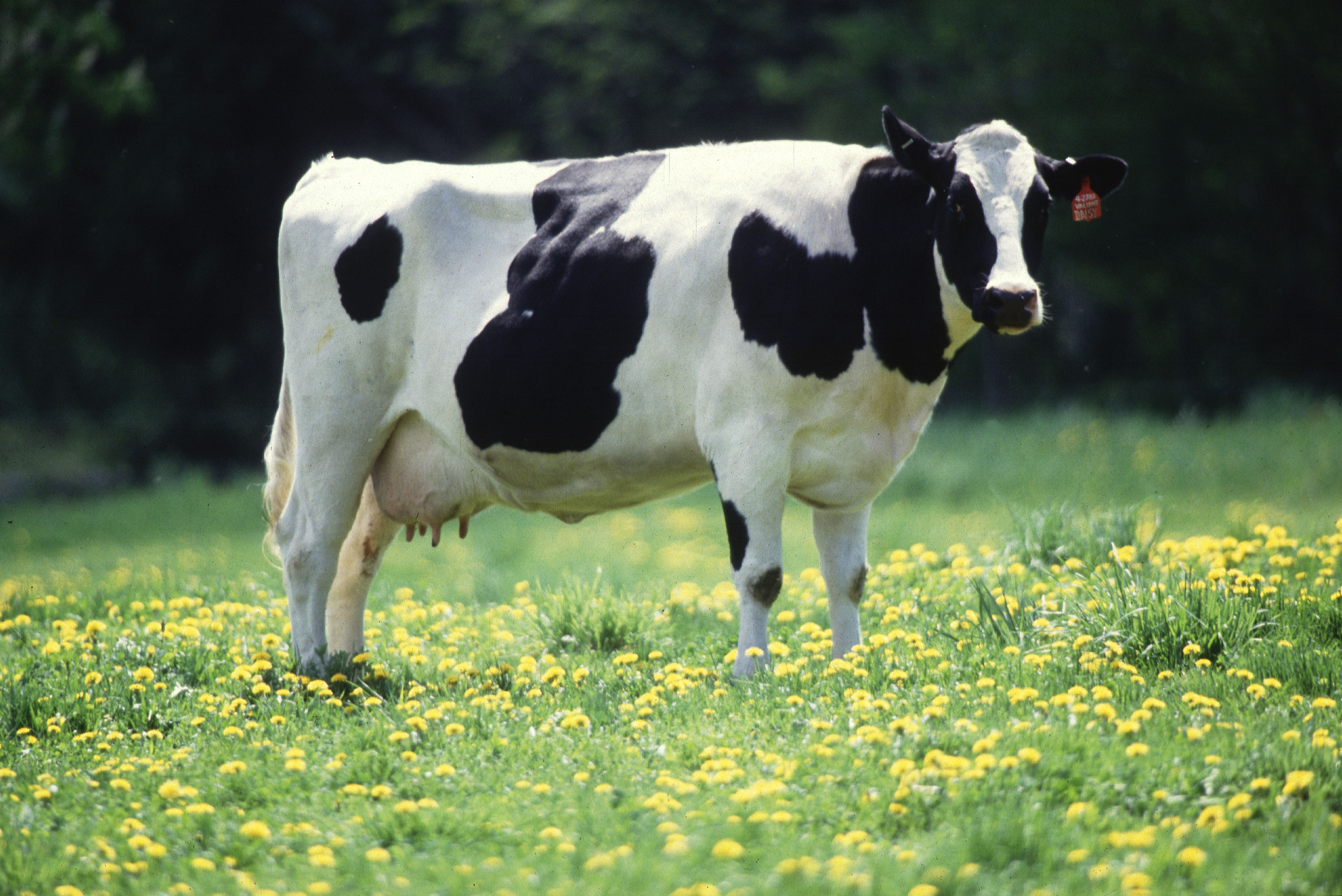
Cattle

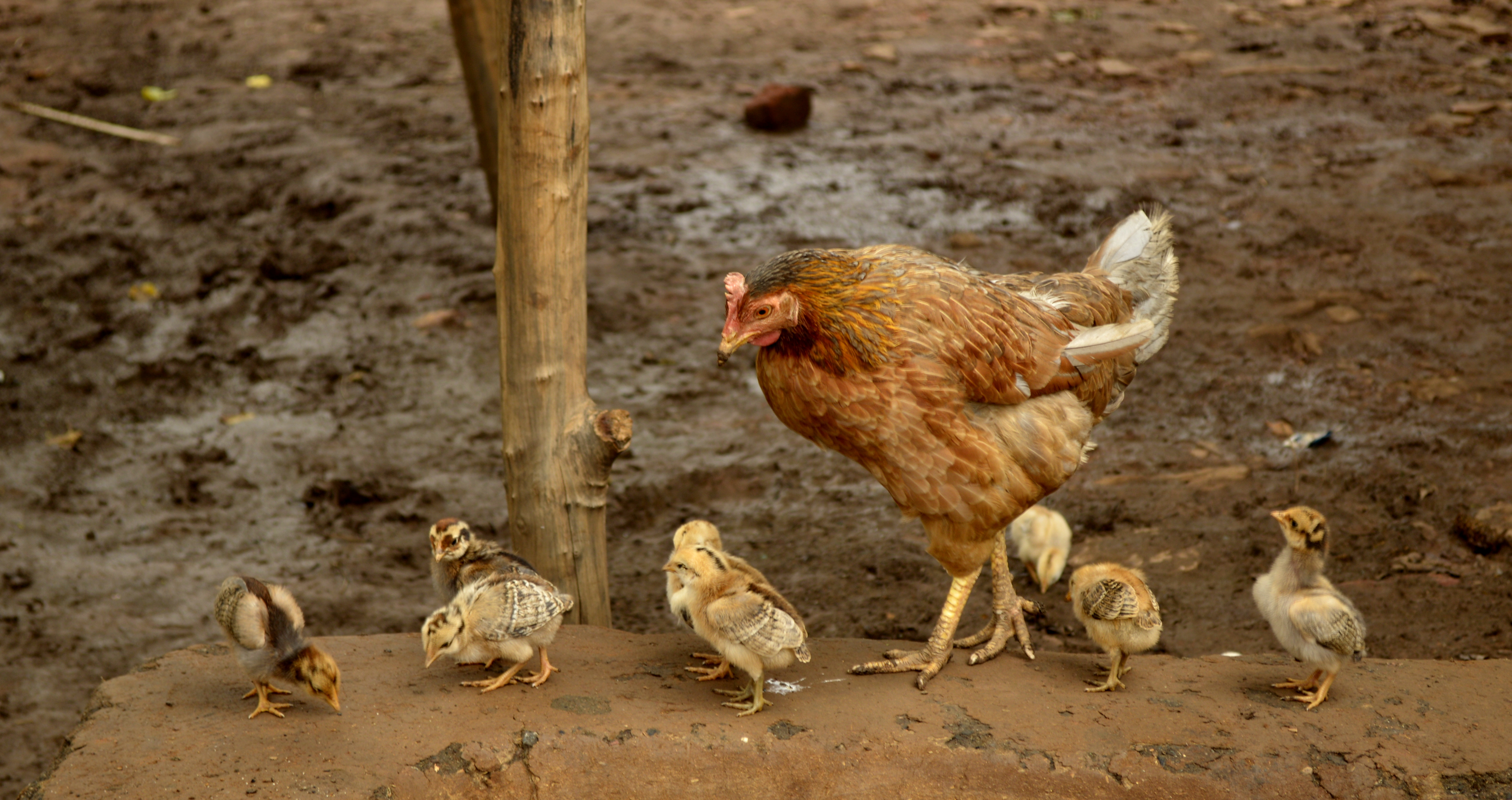
Chicken

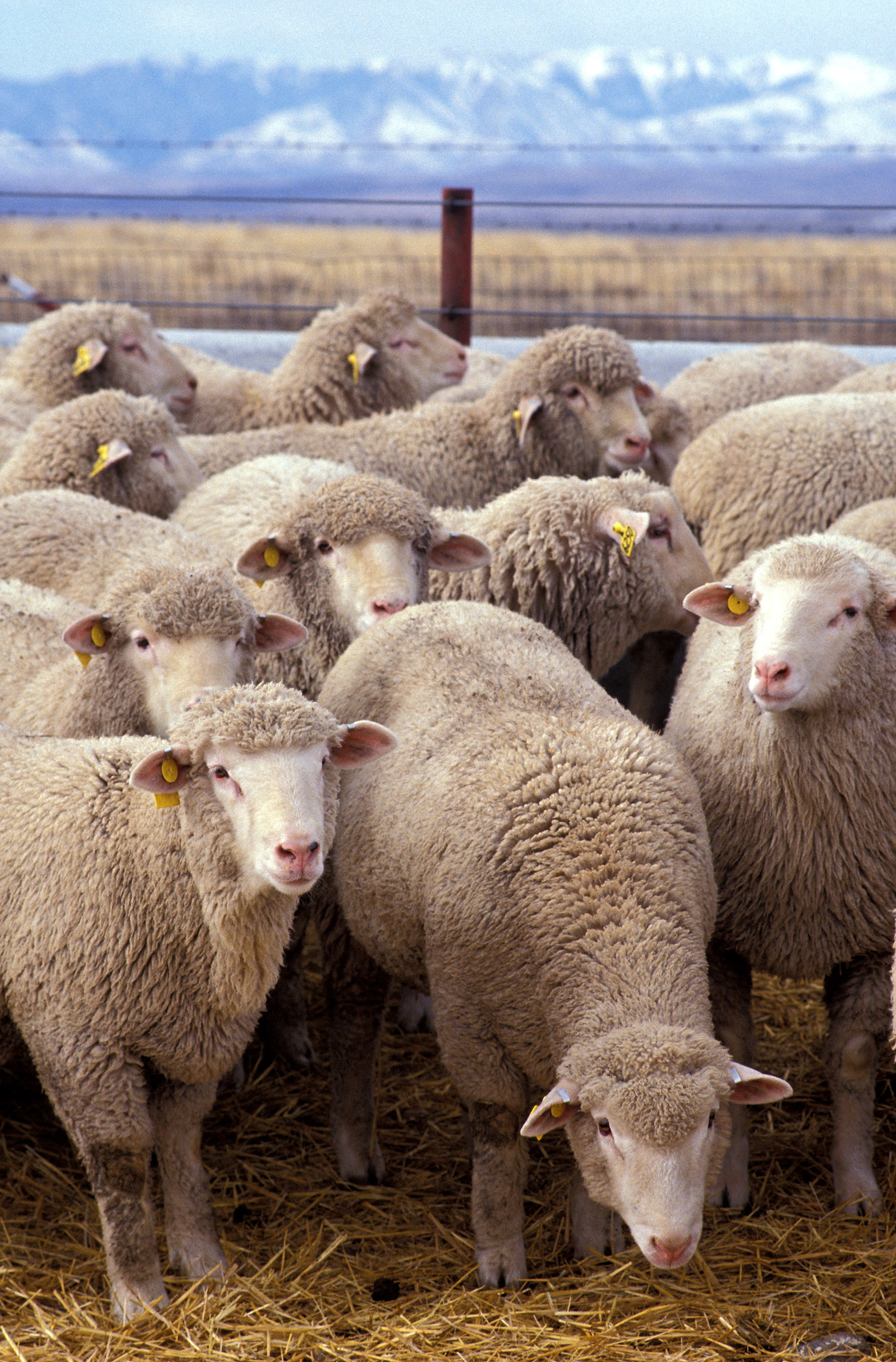
Sheep

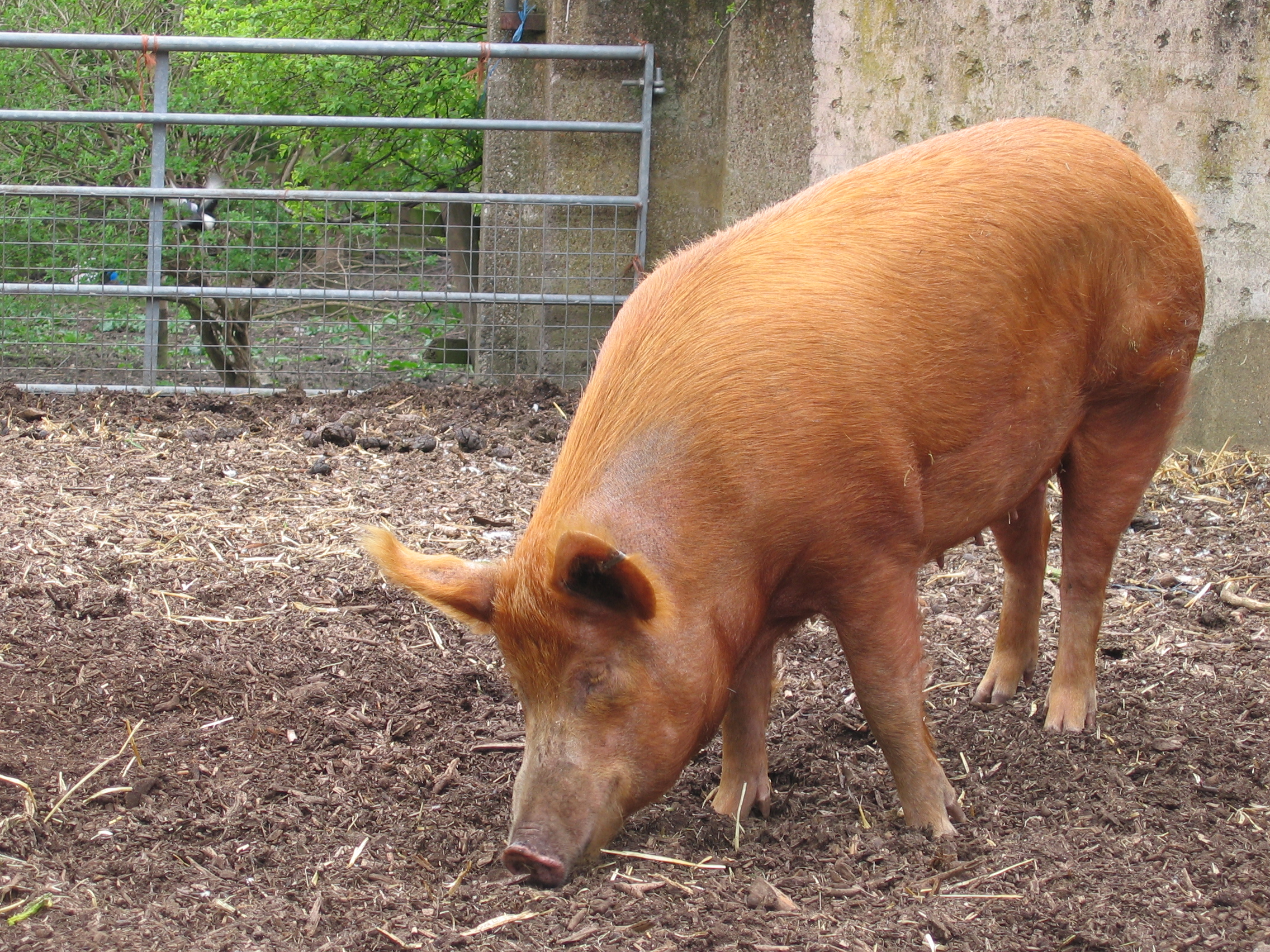
Pig

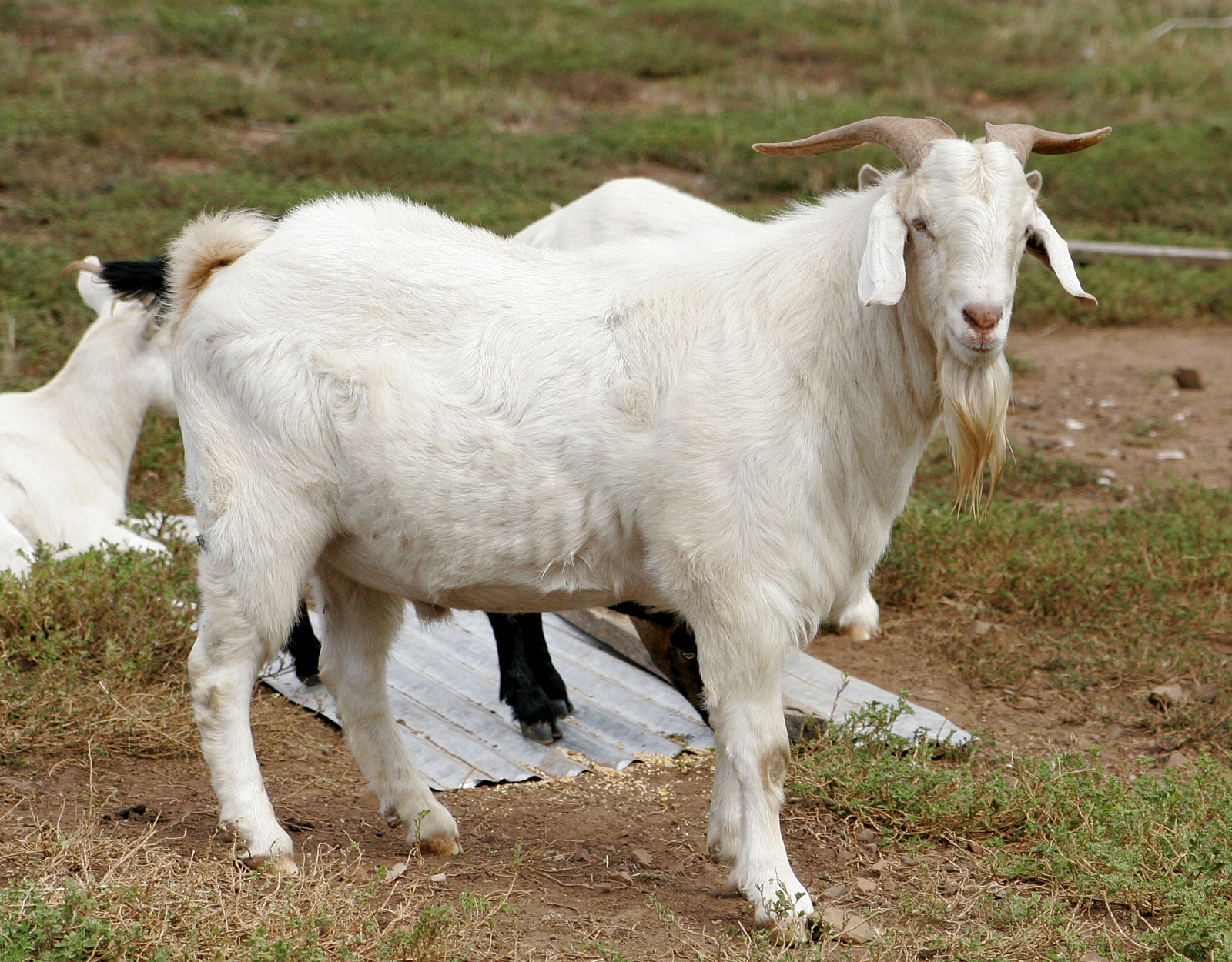
Goat

== History of animal genetic resources ==
The history of animal genetic resources begins about 12,000 to 14,000 years ago. The domestication of major crop and livestock species in the early Neolithic time period changed human evolution and lifestyles. This ability to control food production led to major demographic, technological, political and military changes. Consecutively, thousands of years of natural and human selection, genetic drift, inbreeding, and crossbreeding have contributed to the diversification of animal genetic resources and increased the variety of environments and production systems that livestock keeping takes place. Relatively few species have been domesticated; out of the world's 148 non-carnivorous species weighing more than 45 kg, only 15 have been successfully domesticated. The proportion of domesticated birds used for food and agriculture is even lower- 10 out of 10,000. The reason these numbers are so low is because it is rare to find species with all of the behavioral and physiological traits necessary for domestication. These traits include lack of aggression towards humans, a strong gregarious instinct, a "follow the leader" dominance hierarchy, a tendency not to panic when disturbed, a diet that can be easily supplied by humans (herbivores), a rapid growth rate, relatively short intervals between births, and large litter size.

Besides their initial domestication, dispersion and migration of these domesticated species has had an equally important impact on shaping the composition of livestock diversity. The process of migration likely varied between regions, but certainly involved the movement of human populations and cultural exchanges between populations. In order to look back and determine where livestock domestication occurred, osteometric information from archaeological sites, and ancient livestock DNA studies are useful tools.

Other factors such as mutations, genetic drift and natural and artificial selection have also played a role in shaping the diversity of livestock populations. As animal populations migrated away from their original sites of domestication, sub-populations were formed through geographic and genetic isolation. Interbreeding within these sub-populations between individuals that thrived in the local prevailing environmental conditions (and were thus better able to reproduce) contributed to the formation of distinct groups of animals, known as breeds. This isolation of sub-populations allowed the simultaneous increase in diversification between these sub-populations and increase in uniformity within them. Human intervention through artificial selection of animals with desirable characteristics further increased the differentiation among and uniformity within breeds. Examples of traits that have been deliberately selected by humans include growth rate, milk or egg production, coat color, meat quality, and age of maturity, among many others. The process of artificial selection has been the main reason for gains in output from commercial breeds, whereas the adaptation of indigenous livestock to diverse and challenging environments (natural selection) has been the main factor for their continued survival and production value. Overall, selection, whether it be natural or artificial, generally results in reduced genetic variation.

Over the past 250 years the greatest changes in livestock diversity and creation of formal breeds have occurred mainly due to changes that began in England in the late 18th century. These changes have included development of systematic pedigree and performance recording and applying specific breeding objectives. This led to the fixation of breed-specific traits and an increase in productivity. Some breeds were interbred as distinct, isolated populations, while many breeds continued to interact with each other as a result of intentional cross-breeding or unintended introgression. Before the end of the 19th century, several breeds had been absorbed by other populations. In the 19th century, railways and steamships increased the long-distance transportation of livestock. After the Second World War, artificial insemination became common in cattle and pig breeding. As a result of these developments, a limited number of transboundary commercial breeds, such as the Holstein cow and Large White pig, have become very widespread and nowadays increasingly dominate livestock production globally. Thus, understanding the origins and the history of distribution of livestock is central to maintaining their current utilization and long-term conservation as resources.

== Benefits and uses of livestock diversity ==
The wide number of livestock breeds and the genetic diversity within them mean that animal genetic resources have a substantial value to society. The different breeds provide a wide range of animal products and services for the benefit of humankind. The diversity of animal genetic resources allows livestock to be raised successfully in a diverse range of different environments and underpins the supply of a range of different products and services: from meat, milk and eggs to fuel, manure and draught power.

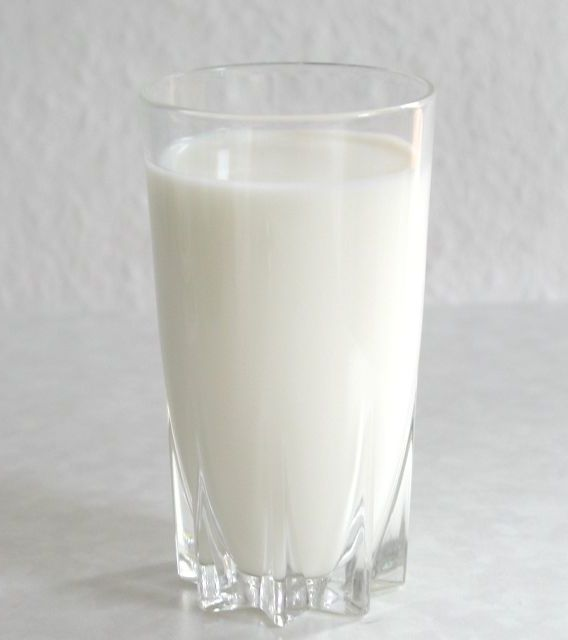
Milk

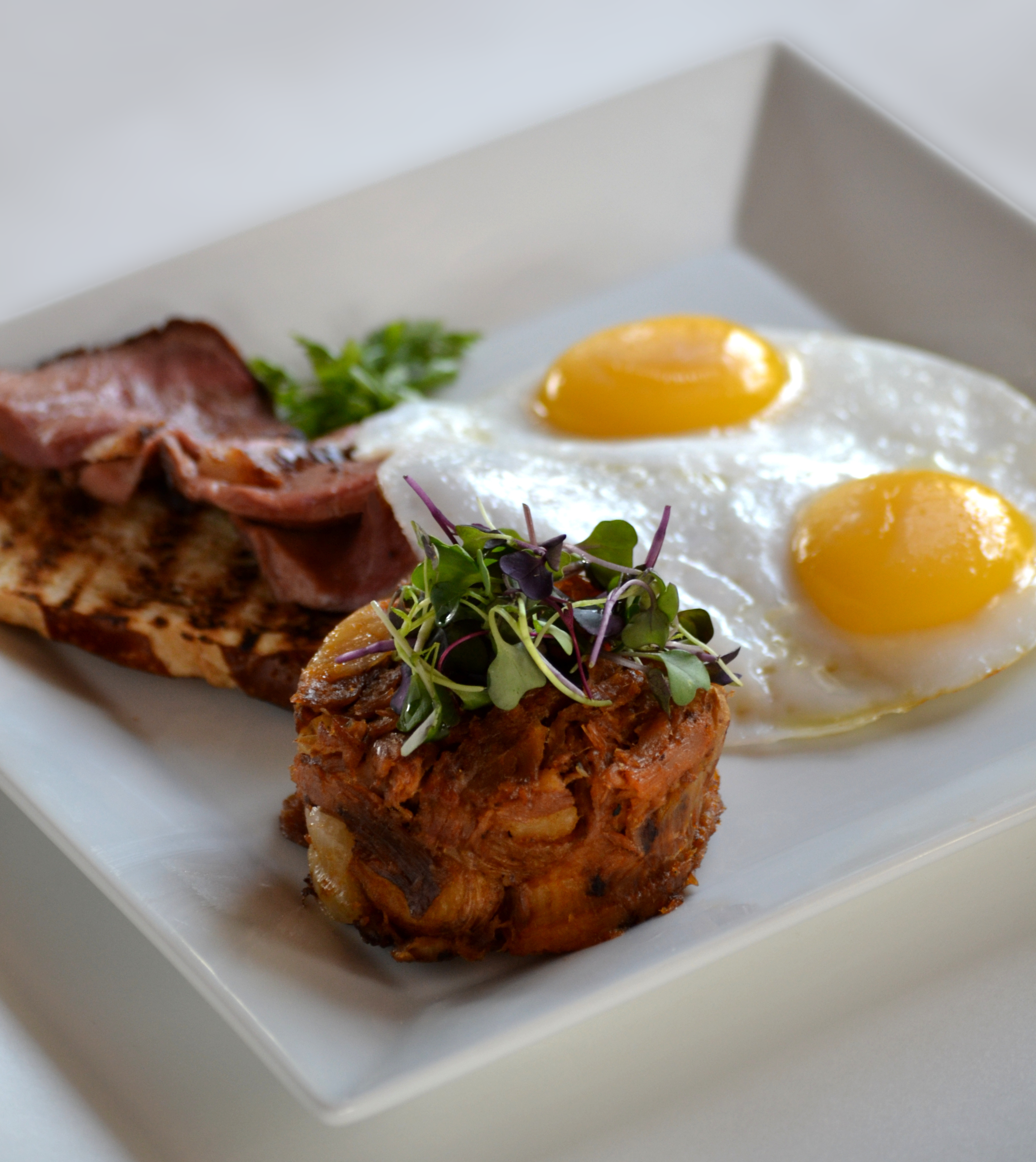
Meat and eggs

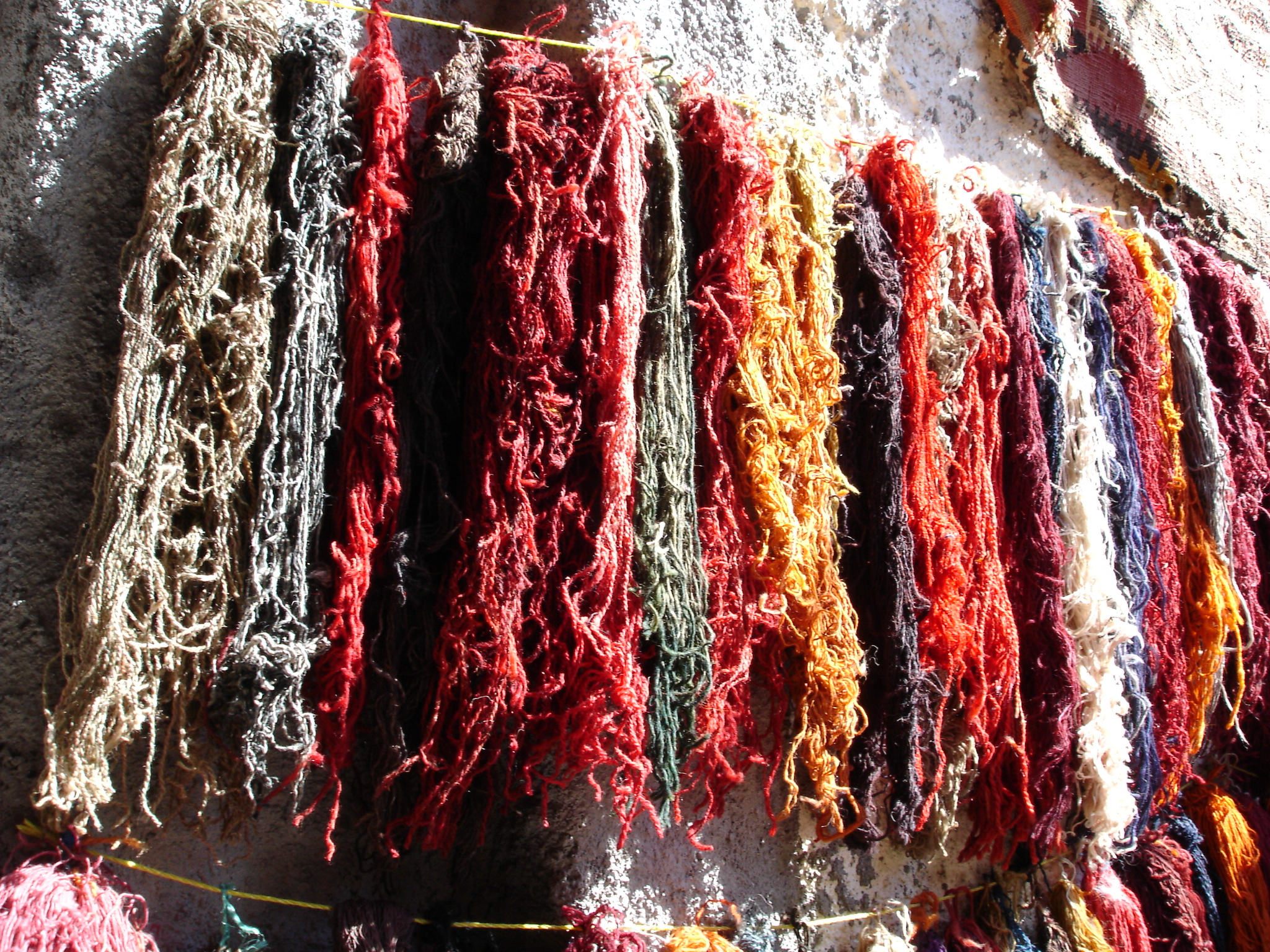
Dyed wool

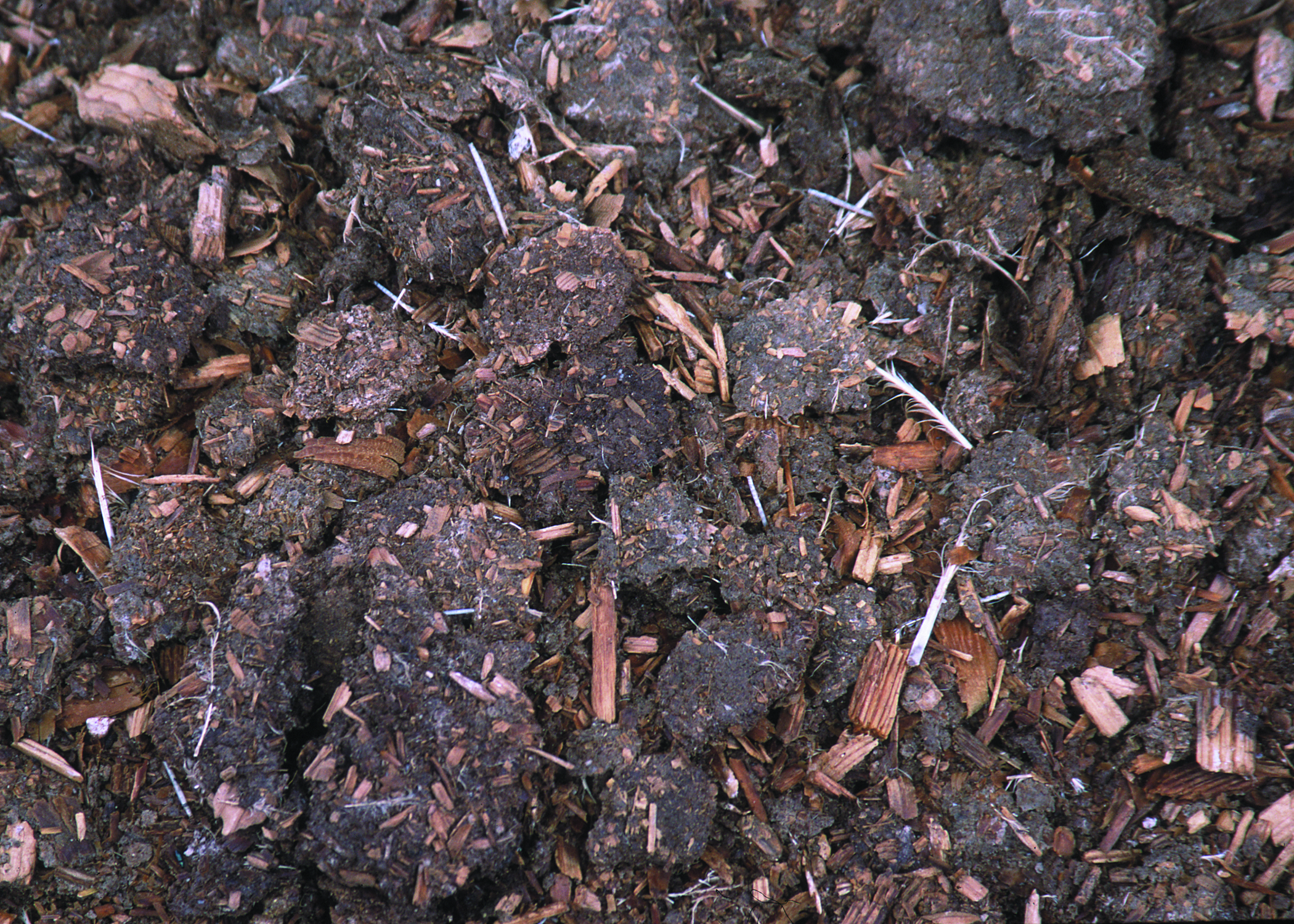
Dung used as fertilizer

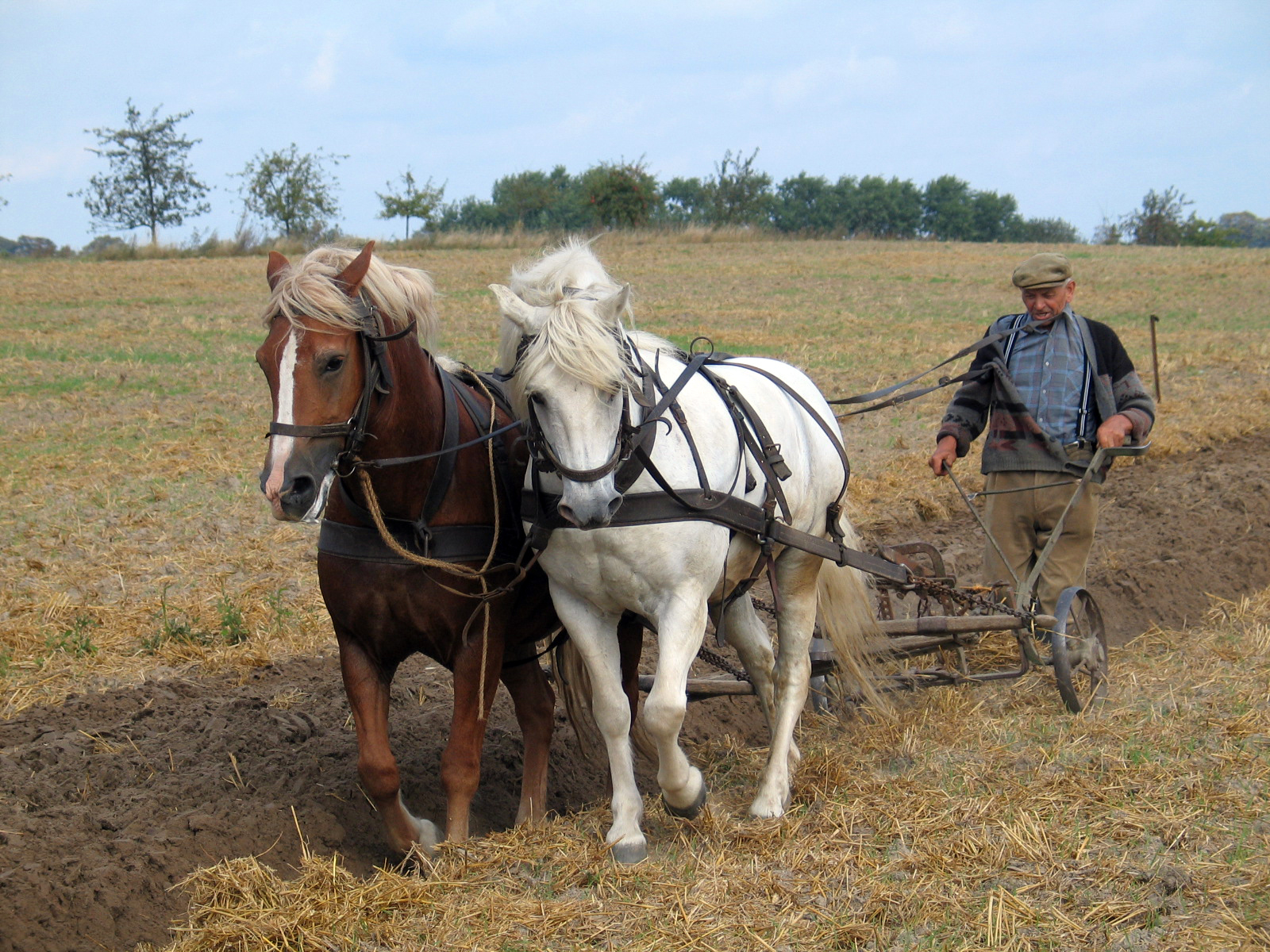
Draught Power

Diversity also allows the flexibility to change breeding goals if needed and emphasize alternative traits in response to changes in markets or other conditions. For example, the Holstein Friesian Cow, which is widely used for its whole milk production. Changes in cereal feed availability or demand for low-solid-content milk may decrease the advantage of breeding Holstein cows.

Different breeds produce specific wool, hairs and leather for clothing, carpets and furniture and are often the basis for traditional garments.

Local breeds that were developed by a given community often have a huge cultural significance for that community. Livestock are often a source of wealth and are critical for its maintenance. They appear frequently in art and often play key roles in traditional customs, such as religious ceremonies, sporting events and weddings. Cultural ecosystem services also create significant economic opportunities in fields such as tourism (including, in the context of food and agriculture, farm holidays and visits to areas with historical or scenic farming or forest landscapes) and recreational hunting.

Breeds that have been developed primarily through natural selection have effectively evolved with their environments and usually provide ecosystem services, such as landscape management, vegetation control, and promotion of biodiversity, that are critical for maintaining those landscapes. For example, the Engadine sheep, which were near extinction in the 1980s, today help to preserve centuries-old grassland in the Alps by eating invasive shrubs. Grazing livestock also help sequester carbon by removing plant material and encouraging regrowth and thus the movement of carbon from the air into soil organic matter.

Greater livestock diversity allows humans to be better prepared to meet future challenges, such as climate change. Having access to a range of diverse livestock traits may allow for greater ability to cope with harsh climates and emerging diseases. Animals with unique adaptive abilities, such as resistance or tolerance to diseases and pests, or ability to thrive on poor feed and cope with dry or hot climates can help humans be more resilient to changes in climate. Within breeds, greater genetic diversity allows for continued selection for improving a given trait, such as disease resistance.

=== Values of animal genetic resources ===
"From a formal economic perspective, AnGR can have various different types of value for conservation. These values can be categorized as follows

- Direct use value – results from benefits obtained from the utilization of animal genetic resources, such as the production of milk or meat.
- Indirect use value – results from the provision of support or protection to other activities that produce benefits, such as through the provision of regulating and supporting ecosystem services (e.g. cycling of soil nutrients, seed dispersal, fire control).
- Option value – results from the potential benefits of having a given resource available for the future; for example, having genetic variability available that can be used to respond to market and environmental changes.
- Bequest value – results from benefits that might be obtained from the knowledge that others may derive benefits from the animal genetic resource in the future.
- Existence value – results only from the satisfaction of knowing that a given animal genetic resource exists, even if no other type of value can be derived from it.

Increasing the direct use value will contribute to the economic sustainability of a breed and therefore to the potential for successful conservation activities."

== Threats to livestock diversity ==
The Pantaneiro cattle of Brazil are only one example of many at risk of extinction. Despite the importance of animal genetic resources, their diversity has been continually decreasing over time.

"Factors as causes of genetic erosion:

- (Indiscriminante) cross-breeding
- Introduction/increased use of exotic breeds
- Lack of/weak AnGR management policies, programmes or institutions
- Breeds not profitable/competitive or have poor performance
- Intensification of production or decline of traditional production systems or small farms
- Disease/disease management
- Loss/lack of grazing land or other elements of the production environment
- Inbreeding or other problems in the management of breeding
- Migration from countryside/uptake of alternative employment
- Changes to consumer/retailer demand/ habits
- Mechanization
- Value of locally adopted breeds not appreciated
- Unspecified economic/market factors
- Climate change
- Globalization, trade liberalization or imports
- Lack of infrastructure or support for production, processing or marketing
- Aging farmers or lack of interest among the young generation"

One of the greatest threats to livestock diversity is pressure from large-scale commercial production systems to maintain only high-output breeds. Recent molecular studies have revealed that the diversity of today's indigenous livestock populations greatly exceeds that found in their commercial counterparts.

Climate change and its impact on livestock is being studied. Changes in climate will affect livestock and food production in many ways. In Africa, different regions are predicted to experience different changes in weather patterns. For example, parts of Madagascar and Mozambique are predicted to have a drier than average rainy season, while just north in parts of central Africa, a wetter December–January season is expected.

Some major disease threats that livestock currently face include, rinderpest, foot and mouth disease, and Peste des petits ruminants (PPR), also known as sheep and goat plague.

== Current state of the world's animal genetic resources ==
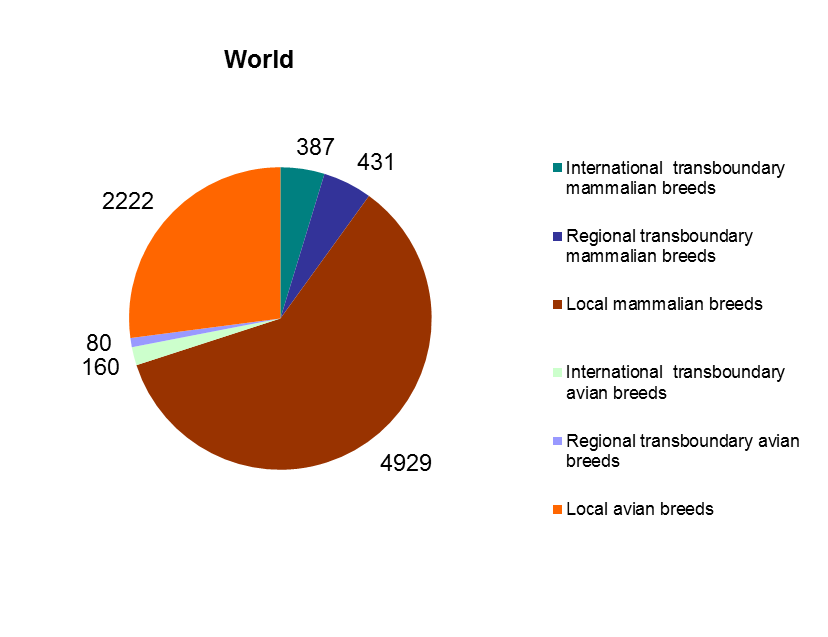
Number of local and transboundary breeds at global level 2018

The Food and Agriculture Organization of the United Nations (FAO) has taken initiative and published two global assessments of livestock biodiversity: The State of the World's Animal Genetic Resources for Food and Agriculture (2007) and The Second Report on the State of the World's Animal Genetic Resources for Food and Agriculture (2015).

Although many diverse species and breeds of animals are currently available for food and agricultural production, there is more work to be done on classifying their risk of extinction: in 2014, 17% of the world's farm animal breeds are at risk of extinction and 58% are of unknown risk status, meaning that the problem may be underestimated. The world's pool of animal genetic resources is also currently shrinking, with rapid and uncontrolled loss of breeds and conjointly their often uncharacterized genes. Nearly 100 livestock breeds have gone extinct between 2000 and 2014. With the loss of these breeds comes the loss of their unique adaptive traits, which are often under the control of many different genes and complex interactions between the genotype and the environment. In order to protect these unique traits, and the diversity they allow, collaborative global efforts towards the characterization and management of these genetic resources must be made. Unlike plants, which can be easily conserved in seed banks, a large portion of livestock genetic diversity relies on live populations and their interactions with the environment.

Progress is being made in the characterization and management of animal genetic resources for food and agriculture. Recent advances in molecular genetics have provided data on the history and current status of animal genetic resources. Genetic markers and molecular studies are being used to characterize livestock diversity and to reconstruct the events that have shaped the present diversity patterns, including ancestry, prehistoric and historical migrations, admixture, and genetic isolation. Exploration of the past is essential to understand trends and to better characterize the current state of animal genetic resources. In 2009, six years after the completion of the human genome project, cattle became one of the first livestock species to have a fully mapped genome.

Some general conclusions from recent molecular studies show that individual breeds only differ by typically 40% in total genetic molecular composition; species differ by about 80% of their genetic material. Additionally, breeds with well-defined and appreciated traits tend to be inbred and have low genetic diversity, while non-descript local populations tend to have high molecular genetic diversity.

== Management of animal genetic resources ==
=== Characterization of animal genetic resources ===
Characterization of animal genetic resources is a prerequisite for its management. Advances in molecular genetics have provided us with tools to better understand livestock origin and diversity. There are many technologies capable of determining genetic profiles, including whole genome sequencing, shotgun sequencing, RNA sequencing and DNA microarray analysis. These techniques allow us to map genomes and then analyze their implications through bioinformatics and statistical analysis. Molecular genetic studies, especially genome-wide association studies and whole-genome sequencing allow adaptive traits to be linked to genomic regions, genes, or even mutations. For example, horn size, meat quality, gait, and prenatal growth in cattle all have single genes found to be responsible for these phenotypic traits.

Specific regions of DNA, such as quantitative trait loci (QTL), include genes affecting observable traits and thus have statistically detectable associations with those traits. However, DNA polymorphisms that are not linked to specific traits are now more commonly used as markers for genetic diversity studies. Different levels of genetic diversity information can be obtained from different kinds of genetic markers. For example, autosomal polymorphisms are used for population diversity estimates, estimation of genetic relationships and population genetic admixture, whereas mitochondrial DNA polymorphisms are used to detect geographic regions of domestication, reconstructing migration routes and the number of female founders. Drawing such inferences is possible because mitochondrial DNA sequences are transferred only through egg cells of the female.

Some general conclusions from recent molecular studies show that individual breeds within species show variation at only about 1% of the genome, whereas the variation of genetic material between species is about 80%. Additionally, breeds with well-defined and appreciated traits tend to be inbred and have low genetic diversity, while non-descript local populations tend to have high molecular genetic diversity.

=== Sustainable use of animal genetic resources ===
There are many forms of livestock-keeping, that all have their own pros and cons in terms of maintaining genetic diversity. Systems range from completely human-controlled to wild. They differ in terms of animal management, animal treatment, environmental impact, and market infrastructure.

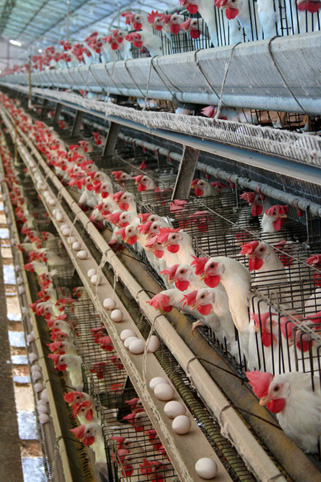
Intensive Chicken Farming

Industrial livestock production
Industrial livestock production or intensive animal farming employs large-scale, principally landless systems. The animals are separated from the land where their feed is produced, and their environment is highly controlled by management interventions. Since a vast majority of consumers demand low-cost products, industrial livestock production has become common. However, there are several issues with industrial livestock production systems including disease, antibiotic use and ethical animal treatment. Living in densely packed cages or small spaces makes animals more prone to disease transmission from one animal to another.

Small-scale livestock production
Small-scale livestock production entails less intensive production cycles, access to outdoors or pasture, typically judicious use of antibiotics, and a connection to local niche markets. This type of livestock production can be maintained in peri-urban and rural settings. There are advantages and disadvantages to each. While it is more difficult and costly to find land for livestock in peri-urban settings, incorporating livestock to small-scale farms can greatly increase the local food supply, reduce garden waste, and provide manure. Peri-urban environments can also provide excellent foraging for bees, with less exposure to the pests, diseases, and even pesticides that can be devastating to a colony. Conversely, rural small-scale livestock production is traditionally more common, and allows for larger-scale operations (although much smaller than industrial systems). However, access to formal markets, both to acquire inputs and to sell outputs, is critical for economic sustainability. Close rural-urban linkages are important to overcome constraints of feed scarcity and to better utilize the advantages of each system.
Mixed farming
Mixed farming systems involves livestock keeping integrated with other agricultural activities. These systems are similar to small-scale systems, but tend to be in a more rural setting, given the need for larger tracts of land for crop production. As with small-scale livestock production, access to formal markets is critical.

Ranching or grass-based production
These systems revolve around access to privately owned or rented grasslands, which the ruminant livestock feed on. In general, the livestock keeper has a fixed home and animals move around the property as needed to obtain freshly grown grass.

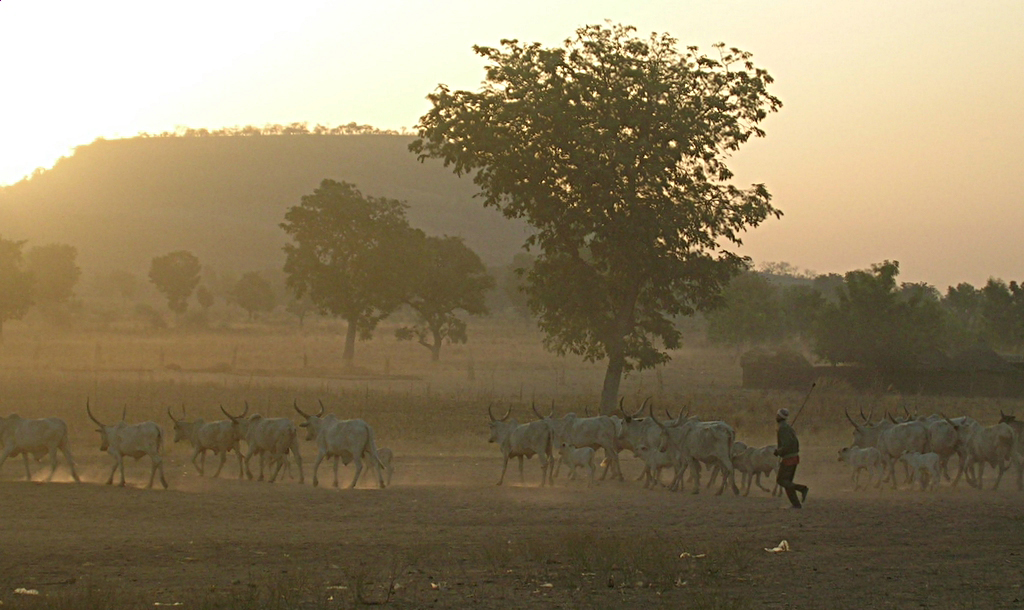
Pastoralism

Pastoralism
Pastoralism plays an important role in livestock management and food security, since pastoralists can produce food where no crops can grow. This system usually relies entirely on publicly owned grasslands. Pastoralists move their livestock herds based on the season, which is also known as transhumance. Nomadic pastoralists follow an irregular pattern of movement. Current issues that pastoralists face include conflict over land rights, access to water, limited food resources, integration into global markets, and animal diseases. Climate change has been believed to harm pastoralists, but evidence suggests that the root causes of land disputes are historical and political, rather than climate-related. Land rights are an issue for pastoralists, as many governments and organizations, including conservation efforts may restrict their access to valuable resources and land.

=== Conservation of animal genetic resources ===
For some breeds, opportunities for sustainable use are limited. For such breeds, to ensure that their critical genetic diversity is not lost, conservation programs are required. Several approaches for conservation can be applied, including in situ conservation with live animal populations, and ex situ conservation or cryoconservation involving the freezing of genetic materials. In many instances, both of these approached are used in a complementary manner. In order to establish and strengthen these programs, more research on methods and technologies must be undertaken, especially for less common livestock species, and greater financial investment is required.

Many countries are currently operating conservation programs for their animal genetic resources, at least for some species and breeds. In situ conservation programs are the most commonly used approach.

== Policy for animal genetic resources ==
The management of issues regarding animal genetic resources on the global level is addressed by the Commission on Genetic Resources for Food and Agriculture (CGRFA), which is a body of FAO. In May 1997, The CGRFA established an Intergovernmental Technical Working Group on Animal Genetic Resources for Food and Agriculture (ITWG-AnGR). The ITWG-AnGR's objectives are to review the situation and issues related to agrobiodiversity of animal genetic resources for food and agriculture. With this knowledge it can make recommendations and advise the Commission on these matters, and consider progress resulting from proposed interventions. This group worked with many partners and countries to produce the First Report on the State of Animal Genetic Resources, which served as the basis for creating the Global Plan of Action for Animal Genetic Resources (GPA). In 2007, the GPA was adopted by 109 countries as the first agreed international framework for the management of livestock biodiversity. The implementation of the GPA is overseen, monitored and evaluated by the CGRFA. The funding for this program arrives from a wide range of actors, under the guidelines of the Funding Strategy for the Implementation of the Global Plan of Action for Animal Genetic Resources.

The access and benefit sharing of animal genetic resources are currently regulated by the Nagoya Protocol on Access and Benefit sharing, which is an agreement to the 1992 Convention on Biological Diversity. The Nagoya Protocol entered into force on 12 October 2014 and aims to provide a legal framework for the fair and equitable distribution of benefits arising from the utilization of all genetic resources, including animal genetic resources for food and agriculture. This protocol may have both positive and negative impacts on the exchange of animal genetic resources between signatory countries.

Within the Agenda 2030 for Sustainable Development, AnGR are addressed under the target 2.5: "By 2020, maintain the genetic diversity of seeds, cultivated plants and farmed and domesticated animals and their related wild species, including through soundly managed and diversified seed and plant banks at the national, regional and international levels, and promote access to and fair and equitable sharing of benefits arising from the utilization of genetic resources and associated traditional knowledge, as internationally agreed."

Which is monitored by the following indicators:

"2.5.1: Number of plant and animal genetic resources for food and agriculture secured in either medium or long term conservation facilities.

2.5.2: Proportion of local breeds, classified as being at risk, not at risk or unknown level of risk of extinction."

Although policies can have some negative consequences, they are nonetheless important. Lack of adequate policies can lead to the insufficient capacity to manage AnGRs, further a loss of genetic diversity and marginalization of relevant stakeholders, such as pastoralists, who are valuable players in maintaining livestock diversity.

To help regulate the ownership of genetic resources and control their utilization is one example where policies are necessary. Patenting of genetic resources is one approach that has been applied. Patenting of animal genetic resources reached its apex in the late 1990s, focusing on expressed sequence tags (ESTs) and single nucleotide polymorphisms (SNPs) with associations in economically important traits. SNPs are important in marker-assisted breeding for the identification of traits such as meat or milk quality. At the same time, patenting activity involving transgenic livestock also increased. However, work on patents and characterization of AnGR declined sharply from 2001, caused by a combination of factors including an increasingly restrictive approach to the patentability of DNA sequences by patent offices and a lack of markets for food products from transgenic animals. Trends in activity arising from genome sequencing projects merit careful attention with regard to their implications (positive or negative) for animal genetic resources management.

Increasingly complex issues are emerging that require balancing the interests of many stakeholders. In a time of rapid and unregulated change, livestock and their products should be used sustainably, developed and ultimately conserved. National planning should integrate "consumer affairs, human health matters, and the management of new biotechnologies, as well as physical and spatial planning of animal production in the context of urban expansion and protected areas."

There are many online databases for policies, national laws, treaties and regulations on food, agriculture and renewable natural resources, including animal genetic resources. FAOLEX is one of the largest online databases, and is run by FAO.
