= Plant genetic resources =

Plant genetic resources materials and uses

Plant genetic resources describes the variability within plants that comes from human and natural selection over millennia. Its intrinsic value mainly concerns agricultural crops (crop biodiversity).

According to the 1983 revised International Undertaking on Plant Genetic Resources for Food and Agriculture of the Food and Agriculture Organization (FAO), plant genetic resources are defined as the entire generative and vegetative reproductive material of species with economical and/or social value, especially for the agriculture of the present and the future, with special emphasis on nutritional plants.

In the State of the World’s Plant Genetic Resources for Food and Agriculture (1998) the FAO defined Plant Genetic Resources for Food and Agriculture (PGRFA) as the diversity of genetic material contained in traditional varieties and modern cultivars as well as crop wild relatives and other wild plant species that can be used now or in the future for food and agriculture.

== History ==
The first use of plant genetic resources dates to more than 10,000 years ago, when farmers selected from the genetic variation they found in wild plants to develop their crops. As human populations moved to different climates and ecosystems, taking the crops with them, the crops adapted to the new environments, developing, for example, genetic traits providing tolerance to conditions such as drought, water logging, frost and extreme heat. These traits - and the plasticity inherent in having wide genetic variability - are important properties of plant genetic resources.

In recent centuries, although humans had been prolific in collecting exotic flora from all corners of the globe to fill their gardens, it wasn’t until the early 20th century that the widespread and organized collection of plant genetic resources for agricultural use began in earnest. Russian geneticist Nikolai Vavilov, considered by some as the father of plant genetic resources, realized the value of genetic variability for breeding and collected thousands of seeds during his extensive travels to establish one of the first gene banks. Vavilov inspired the American Jack Harlan to collect seeds from across the globe for the United States Department of Agriculture (USDA). David Fairchild, another botanist at USDA, successfully introduced many important crops (e.g. cherries, soybeans, pistachios) into the United States.

It was not until 1967 that the term genetic resources was coined by Otto Frankel and Erna Bennett at the historic International Conference on Crop Plant Exploration and Conservation, organized by the FAO and the International Biological Program (IBP) “The effective utilization of genetic resources requires that they are adequately classified and evaluated” was a key message from the conference.

== Conservation ==
Plant genetic resource conservation has become increasingly important as more plants have become threatened or rare. At the same time, an exploding world population and rapid climate change have led humans to seek new resilient and nutritious crops. Plant conservation strategies generally combine elements of conservation on farm (as part of the crop production cycle, where it continues to evolve and support farmer needs), ex situ (for example in gene banks or field collections as seed or tissue samples) or in situ (where they grow in the wild or protected areas). Most in situ conservation concerns crop wild relatives, an important source of genetic variation to crop breeding programs.

Plant genetic resources that are conserved by any of these methods are often referred to as germplasm, which is a shorthand term meaning "any genetic materials". The term originates from germ plasm, August Weismann's theory that heritable information is transmitted only by germ cells, and which has been superseded by modern insights on inheritance, including epigenetics and non-nuclear DNA.

After the Second World War, efforts to conserve plant genetic resources came mainly from breeders’ organizations in the USA and Europe, which led to crop-specific collections primarily located in developed countries (e.g. IRRI, CIMMYT). In the 1960s and 1970s, more focus was put on the collection and conservation of plant genetic resources in face of genetic erosion by organizations such as the Rockefeller Foundation and the European Society of Breeding Research (EUCARPIA).

A key event in the conservation of plant genetic resources was the establishment of the International Board for Plant Genetic Resources (IBPGR) (now Bioversity International) in 1974, whose mandate was to promote and assist in the worldwide effort to collect and conserve the plant germplasm needed for future research and production. IBPGR mobilized scientists to create a global network of gene banks, thus marking the international recognition of the importance of plant genetic resources.

In 2002, the Global Crop Diversity Trust was established by Bioversity International on behalf of the CGIAR and the FAO through a Crop Diversity Endowment Fund. The goal of the Trust is to provide a secure and sustainable source of funding for the world's most important ex situ crop collections.

== Policy ==
In response to the growing awareness of the global value of and threat to biological diversity, the United Nations drafted the 1992 Convention on Biological Diversity (CBD), the first global multilateral treaty focused on the conservation and sustainable use of biodiversity. Article 15 of the CBD specified that countries have national sovereignty over their genetic resources, but that there should be facilitated access and benefit sharing (ABS) under mutually agreed terms and with prior informed consent.

Going further to protect national sovereignty of plant genetic resources, an instrumental piece of legislation, the International Treaty on Plant Genetic Resources for Food and Agriculture (ITPGRFA), was adopted by the FAO in November 2001 and came into force in 2004.

The ITPGRFA established several mechanisms under the Multilateral System, which grants free access and equitable use of 64 of the world’s most important crops (Annex 1 crops) for some uses (research, breeding and training for food and agriculture). The treaty prevents the recipients of genetic resources from claiming intellectual property rights over those resources in the form in which they received them, and ensures that access to genetic resources is consistent with international and national laws. This is facilitated by the Standard Material Transfer Agreement, a mandatory contract between providers and recipients for the exchange of germplasm under the Multilateral System. The Governing Body of the treaty, through FAO as the Third Party Beneficiary, has an interest in the agreements.

The Nagoya Protocol on Access to Genetic Resources and the Fair and Equitable Sharing of Benefits Arising from their Utilization is a supplementary agreement to the Convention on Biological Diversity that was adopted in 2010 and enforced in 2014. It provides greater legal transparency to policies governing fair and equitable sharing of benefits arising from the utilization of genetic resources.

== Issues and controversies ==
Due to the high value and complexity of plant genetic resources and the number of parties involved globally, some issues have arisen over their conservation and use.

Much of the material for breeding programs was collected from the Southern Hemisphere and sent to gene banks in the Northern Hemisphere, a concern that led to more emphasis on the national sovereignty of plant genetic resources and instigated policies that addressed the imbalance.

The increased use of plant genetic information for research, for example to find genes of interest for drought tolerance, has led to controversy on whether and to what extent the genetic data (separate from the organism) are subject to the international ABS regulations described above.

Forest genetic resources represent a specific case of plant genetic resources.

== See also ==
=== Internal links ===
- Biopiracy
- Bioprospecting
- Plant Treaty
- Convention on Biological Diversity and Nagoya Protocol
- UPOV Convention on New Varieties of Plants
- Farmers rights / Peasants' rights
- Access and Benefit Sharing Agreement
- Genetic resources (disambiguation)

=== External links ===
- Food and Agriculture Organization of the United Nations (FAO)
- Convention on Biological Diversity (CBD)
- International Treaty on Plant Genetic Resources for Food and Agriculture (Plant Treaty)
- International Convention for the Protection of New Varieties of Plants (UPOV Convention)
- Bioversity International
