= International Treaty on Plant Genetic Resources for Food and Agriculture =

2001 treaty on plant genetic resources

Plant Treaty
International Treaty on Plant Genetic Resources for Food and Agriculture
- Signed: 2001
- Location: Rome
- Effective: 29 June 2004
- Parties: 155 contracting parties (154 states, 1 organization) as of 19 November 2025
- Depositary: Secretary-General of the United Nations
- Languages: Arabic, Chinese, English, French, Russian and Spanish

The International Treaty on Plant Genetic Resources for Food and Agriculture (also known as ITPGRFA, International Seed Treaty or Plant Treaty) is a comprehensive international agreement in harmony with the Convention on Biological Diversity, which aims at guaranteeing food security through the conservation, exchange and sustainable use of the world's plant genetic resources for food and agriculture (PGRFA), the fair and equitable benefit sharing arising from its use, as well as the recognition of farmers' rights. It was signed in 2001 in Madrid, and entered into force on 29 June 2004.

== Main features ==
=== Participating countries ===
There are 155 contracting parties to the Plant Treaty (154 Member States and 1 intergovernmental organization, the European Union) as of July 2024.

=== Farmers' rights ===
The treaty recognises farmers' rights, subject to national laws to: a) the protection of traditional knowledge relevant to plant genetic resources for food and agriculture; b) the right to equitably participate in sharing benefits arising from the utilisation of plant genetic resources for food and agriculture; and c) the right to participate in making decisions, at the national level, on matters related to the conservation and sustainable use of plant genetic resources for food and agriculture. The Treaty establishes the Multilateral System of Access and Benefit-sharing to facilitate plant germplasm exchanges and benefit sharing through Standard Material Transfer Agreement (SMTA).

However, as Regine Andersen of the farmers' rights project, among others, including Olivier De Schutter, the UN Special Rapporteur on the Right to Food, argue, the interpretation and realisation of farmers' rights is weak and is not the same across all countries. Without a consistent, strong international focus on realising the rights of farmers who conserve and sustainably use PGRFA to save, use, exchange and sell seeds saved on-farm, genetic variety of crops and related agricultural biodiversity will suffer. India, for example, includes an interpretation of farmers' rights in its Plant Variety Protection and Farmers' Rights (PPV&FR) Act, 2001, allowing farmers a restricted right to save and sell seed they have produced on-farm as they always have, even if it contains genes from a protected variety.

In 2019, the adoption of the United Nations Declaration on the Rights of Peasants and other people working in rural areas reaffirmed the farmers' rights contained in the Plant Treaty.

=== Multilateral system ===
The treaty has implemented a Multilateral System (MLS) of access and benefit sharing, among those countries that ratify the treaty, for a list of 64 of some of the most important food and forage crops essential for food security and interdependence. The genera and species are listed in Annex 1 to the treaty.

The treaty was negotiated by the Food and Agriculture Organization of the United Nations (FAO) Commission on Genetic Resources for Food and Agriculture (CGRFA) and since 2006 has its own Governing Body under the aegis of the FAO. The Governing Body is the highest organ of the Treaty as established in Article 19. Composed of representatives of all Contracting Parties, its basic function is to promote the full implementation of the Treaty, including the provision of policy guidance on the implementation of the Treaty. The Governing Body elects its Chairperson and Vice-Chairpersons, in conformity with its Rules of Procedure. They are collectively referred to as "the Bureau".

Some believe the treaty could be an example of responsible global governance for ensuring that plant genetic resources essential for present and future food security can be kept accessible to all farmers and in the public domain. Chapter 7 of the Second Report on the State of the World's Plant Genetic Resources for Food and Agriculture (SoWPGR-2) entitled "Access to Plant Genetic Resources, the sharing of benefits arising out of their utilization and the realization of Farmers' Rights" is mainly dedicated to the International Treaty.

=== Governing body ===
- The Governing Body met for the first time in Madrid in June 2006. It had a ministerial segment and a ministerial declaration was adopted and included in the Report.
- The Second Session of the Governing Body was held in Rome in October/November 2007. This meeting discussed the implementation of Farmers' Rights, financial rules; the funding strategy, relationship with the Global Crop Diversity Trust; implementation of the Multilateral System (MLS) for access and benefit-sharing, among other issues.
- The Third Session of the Governing Body was held in Tunis in June 2009. This meeting continued the unfinished business of the previous meeting and discussed, among other issues, funding strategy, compliance, sustainable use, the implementation of Farmers' Rights, relationship with the Global Crop Diversity Trust and the CGRFA, implementation of the Multilateral System (MLS) for access and benefit-sharing.
- The Fourth Session of the Governing Body was held in Bali, Indonesia in March 2011. Prior to the Governing Body meeting, Ministers adopted the Bali Declaration on the Treaty that commits them to engage in further enhancing Treaty implementation to help meet the challenges of agricultural biodiversity erosion, food insecurity, extreme poverty and the effects of climate change; and calls upon parties and relevant stakeholders to prioritize activities relevant to the MLS, sustainable use of PGRFA, and Farmers' Rights, and to mobilize more funds. With the addition of 'compliance' mechanisms and financial rules, these issues took up most negotiating time in the Governing Body meeting. The relationship of the Treaty with the CGRFA, the CBD's Nagoya Protocol, the Global Crop Diversity Trust and Bioversity International were also included in resolutions.
- The Fifth Session of the Governing Body was held in Muscat, Oman in September 2013. The session was preceded by two days of regional consultations. The Fifth Session achieved:
  - a resolution on Farmers' Rights (FRs), which renewed the commitment of governments to implement Farmers' Rights;
  - a coded call to UPOV and WIPO to report on their impacts on Farmers' Rights;
  - warm acceptance of the offer by Farmers' Organisations to produce a report for GB6 on the state of implementation of Farmers' Rights;
  - actions designed to improve the sustainable use of Plant Genetic Resources for Food and Agriculture, linked to commitments to realise Farmers' Rights;
  - commitments to review and change the multi-lateral Access and Benefit Sharing mechanism (MLS), to prevent pillaging of the System by patents on native traits, for example;
  - significant new voluntary financial contributions from Norway for the Global Crop Diversity Trust and for the benefit sharing fund to support on-farm conservation;
  - acceptance of the distinction between NGOs and Farmers' Organisations and the need to include representatives of farmers' social movements in negotiations;
  - a request to the Secretary to report on relevant discussions that relate to Farmers' Rights within other UN fora including the Committee on World Food Security. Civil Society including NGOs (e.g. CENESTA) and the International Farmers' Movement, La Via Campesina, were active throughout the Session.

=== List of crops covered in Annex 1 ===
Even foods that have been part of a culture for centuries often are indigenous to a region on the other side of the world. This global dispersal shows the generosity with which farmers and farming communities have always shared seeds and genetic materials with neighbors or through trade. As people ventured forth, looking for new lands, their seeds were part of their diasporas. As a result, we now live in a world in which not one country can be considered self-sufficient in terms of being able to survive solely on crops indigenous within its borders. The Treaty facilitates the continued open exchange of food crops and their genetic materials.

The list of plant genetic material included in the Multilateral System of the Treaty is made of major food crops and forages. The Forages are also divided in legume forages and grass forages. They were selected taking into account the criteria of food security and country interdependence.

== History, negotiations, and entry into force ==
The treaty was under negotiation for 7 years. A previous voluntary agreement, the International Undertaking on Plant Genetic Resources for Food and Agriculture (IU), was adopted in 1983. However, the IU was reliant on the principle of genetic resources being the common heritage of humanity. The Convention on Biological Diversity (CBD) (1993) brought genetic resources under the jurisdiction and sovereignty of national governments. However, the CBD recognised the special and distinctive nature of agricultural genetic resources: they were international – crossing countries and continents – their conservation and sustainable use requires distinctive solutions and they were important internationally for food security. Subsequently, the IU was renegotiated, to bring it in harmony with the CBD, and was renamed as a treaty. An account of the long process to achieve the treaty called Negotiating the Seed Treaty can be found at Wayback Machine.

The treaty was approved during the FAO Conference (31st Session resolution 3/2001) on 3 November 2001, with 116 votes and 2 abstentions (US and Japan). In accordance with its Article 25, it was opened for signatures until 4 November 2002 by all members of FAO or any state member of the United Nations or of the International Atomic Energy Agency. It was subject to ratification, acceptance or approval (Article 26), by all members.

The International Treaty on Plant Genetic Resources for Food and Agriculture was open to accession a year after adoption and once closed to signatures (Article 27), i.e., on 4 November 2002. 77 countries and the European Union had signed the treaty by that date.

In accordance with Article 28, the treaty entered into force on the ninetieth day after the deposit of the fortieth instrument of ratification, acceptance, approval or accession, provided that at least twenty instruments of ratification, acceptance, approval or accession have been deposited by Members of FAO. Having reached the required number of instruments in order for the treaty to enter into force (40) on 31 March 2004, on which date 13 instruments (including the European Union) were deposited with the Director-General of FAO, the date of entry into force was on 29 June 2004.

== Discussions and criticism ==
Plant genetic resources are essential to a sustainable agriculture and food security. FAO estimates humans have used some 10,000 species for food throughout history. However, only about 120 cultivated species provide around 90% of food requirements and four species (maize, wheat, rice and potatoes) provide about 60% of human dietary energy for the world's population. Of the myriad of varieties of these crops developed by farmers over millennia, which form an important part of agricultural biodiversity, more than 75% have been lost in the past 100 years.

Some fear that corporate financial interests might prevent safeguarding of livelihoods, promotion of food security, biodiversity-rich farming under control of local communities, and implementation of Farmers' Rights.

Critics say many of the central issues are unresolved or open to interpretation. Some of the points raised are:

- to what extent will intellectual property rights be allowed on genetic resources in the MLS, within treaty rules: some argue an agreement aiming at open access to genetic resources for food and agriculture should not allow restrictive property rights, and the treaty says in Article 12.3.d that "Recipients shall not claim any intellectual property or other rights that limit the facilitated access to the plant genetic resources for food and agriculture, or their genetic parts or components, in the form received from the Multilateral System";
- to what extent will farmers and communities be allowed to freely use, exchange, sell and breed the seeds, and what enforcement procedures will be used by national governments to ensure principles of Farmers' Rights will be respected;
- The mechanism for dispute settlement under the Third Party Beneficiary and the role of FAO.
- The first group of 11 projects funded by the treaty was announced during the Third Session of the Governing Body in Tunis in June 2009. The projects were funded according to criteria established by the Governing Body including regional balance: 5 from Latin America, 5 from Africa and 1 from Asia. The ranking of the projects was done by a Group of Experts nominated by the 7 regional representatives of the Bureau and the final approval was done by the Bureau on behalf of the Governing Body.
- While the whole Brassica family (Cruciferae) including all its sub-species and varieties is in the MLS, the total number of food crops and forages and their relatives included in the treaty is very limited. Soya, sugar cane, oil palm and groundnut are among important crops missing from the list in Annex 1.

The treaty came into force on 29 June 2004, at which time there were more than 54 ratifications by countries. An article prepared on the occasion of the treaty becoming law is posted at International Seed Treaty becomes Law - 29 June 2004. From the entry into force, countries that previously signed are allowed to ratify the treaty, while countries that did not sign the treaty before it came into force can also accede to it. The instrument of ratification has to be deposited with the Director-General of FAO.

== See also ==
- Biopiracy
- Seedbank
- Plant genetic resources
- Seed security
- Germplasm
- Genesys
- Convention on Biological Diversity
- Nagoya Protocol to the Convention on Biological Diversity
- UPOV Convention on New Varieties of Plants
- United Nations Declaration on the Rights of Peasants
