= Ex situ conservation =

Preservation of plants or animals outside their natural habitats

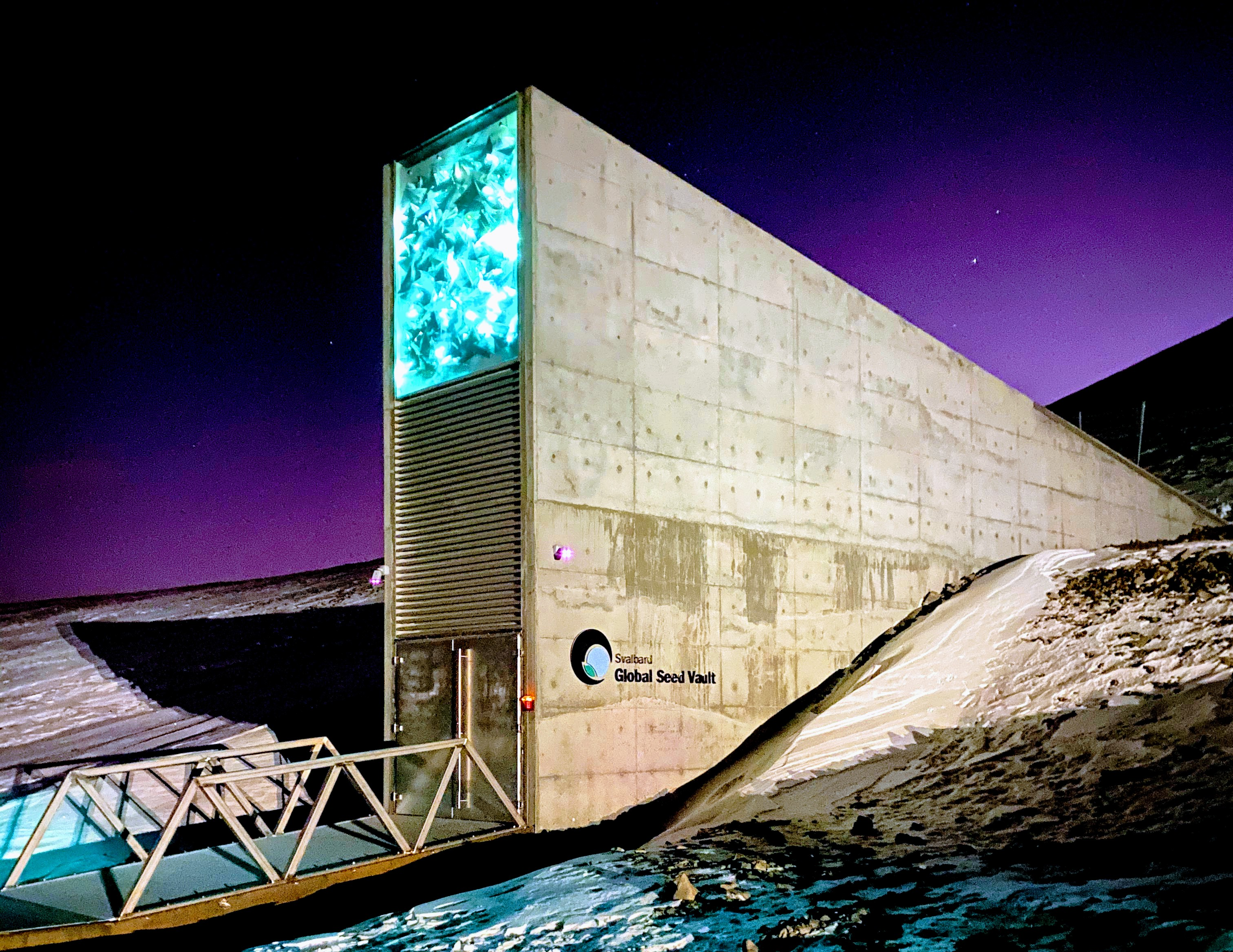
Svalbard Global Seed Bank, an ex situ conservation

Ex situ conservation (lit. 'off-site conservation') is the process of protecting an endangered species, variety, or breed of plant or animal outside its natural habitat. For example, by removing part of the population from a threatened habitat and placing it in a new location, an artificial environment which is similar to the natural habitat of the respective animal and within the care of humans, such as a zoological park or wildlife sanctuary. The degree to which humans control or modify the natural dynamics of the managed population varies widely, and this may include alteration of living environments, reproductive patterns, access to resources, and protection from predation and mortality.

Ex situ management can occur within or outside a species' natural geographic range. Individuals maintained ex situ exist outside an ecological niche. This means that they are not under the same selection pressures as wild populations, and they may undergo artificial selection if maintained ex situ for multiple generations.

Agricultural biodiversity is also conserved in ex situ collections. This is primarily in the form of gene banks where samples are stored in order to conserve the genetic resources of major crops plants and their wild relatives.

== Facilities ==
=== Botanical gardens, zoos, and aquariums ===
Botanical gardens, zoos, and aquariums are the most conventional sites for ex situ conservation, housing whole, protected specimens for breeding and reintroduction into the wild. These facilities provide not only housing and care for specimens of endangered species, but also have an educational value. They inform the public of the threatened status of endangered species and of those factors which cause the threat, with the hope of creating public interest in stopping and reversing those factors which jeopardize a species' survival in the first place. They are the most publicly visited ex situ conservation sites, with the WZCS (World Zoo Conservation Strategy) estimating that the 1,100 organized zoos in the world receive more than 600 million visitors annually. Globally there is an estimated total of 2,107 aquaria and zoos in 125 countries. Additionally many private collectors or other not-for-profit groups hold animals and they engage in conservation or reintroduction efforts. In the United States, there are approximately 2,000 botanical gardens in 148 counties cultivating or storing an estimated 80,000 taxa of plants in 2004.

== Techniques for plants ==
=== Cryopreservation ===
Plant cryopreservation consist of the storage of seeds, pollen, tissue, or embryos in liquid nitrogen. This method can be used for virtually indefinite storage of material without deterioration over a much greater time-period relative to all other methods of ex situ conservation. Cryopreservation is also used for the conservation of livestock genetics through cryoconservation of animal genetic resources. Technical limitations prevent the cryopreservation of many species, but cryobiology is a field of active research, and many studies concerning plants are underway.

=== Seed banking ===
The storage of seeds in a temperature and moisture controlled environment. This technique is used for taxa with orthodox seeds that tolerate desiccation. Seed bank facilities vary from sealed boxes to climate controlled walk-in freezers or vaults. Taxa with recalcitrant seeds that do not tolerate desiccation are typically not held in seed banks for extended periods of time.

=== Field gene banking ===
An extensive open-air planting used maintain genetic diversity of wild, agricultural, or forestry species. Typically species that are either difficult or impossible to conserve in seed banks are conserved in field gene banks. Field gene banks may also be used grow and select progeny of species stored by other ex situ techniques.

=== Cultivation collections ===
Plants under horticultural care in a constructed landscape, typically a botanic garden or arboreta. This technique is similar to a field gene bank in that plants are maintained in the ambient environment, but the collections are typically not as genetically diverse or extensive. These collections are susceptible to hybridization, artificial selection, genetic drift, and disease transmission. Species that cannot be conserved by other ex situ techniques are often included in cultivated collections.

=== Inter situ ===
Plants are under horticulture care, but the environment is managed to near natural conditions. This occurs with either restored or semi-natural environments. This technique is primarily used for taxa that are rare or in areas where habitat has been severely degraded.

=== Tissue culture (storage and propagation) ===
Somatic tissue can be stored in vitro for short periods of time. This is done in a light and temperature controlled environment that regulates the growth of cells. As an ex situ conservation technique tissue culture is primary used for clonal propagation of vegetative tissue or immature seeds. This allows for the proliferation of clonal plants from a relatively small amount of parent tissue.

== Techniques for animals ==
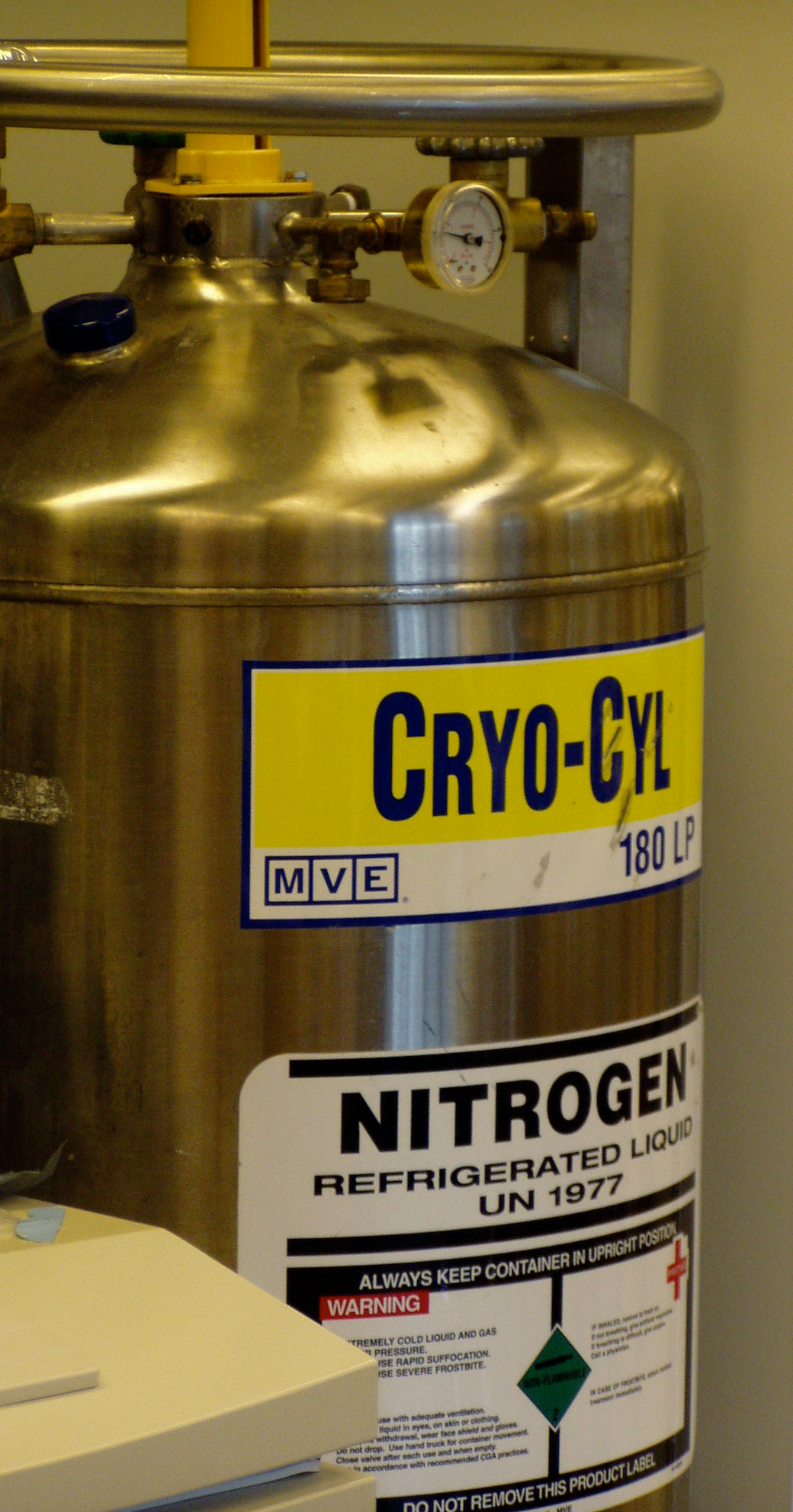
A tank of liquid nitrogen, used to supply a cryogenic freezer (for storing laboratory samples at a temperature of about −150 °C)

Endangered animal species and breeds are preserved using similar techniques. Animal species can be preserved in genebanks, which consist of cryogenic facilities used to store living sperm, eggs, or embryos. For example, the Zoological Society of San Diego has established a "frozen zoo" to store such samples using cryopreservation techniques from more than 355 species, including mammals, reptiles, and birds.

A potential technique for aiding in reproduction of endangered species is interspecific pregnancy, implanting embryos of an endangered species into the womb of a female of a related species, carrying it to term. It has been carried out for the Spanish ibex.

Another promising technique is isochoric vitrification, where a zygote or mature animal is frozen in vitrification solution and, when slowly thawed using a laser, produces viable organisms.

== Genetic management of captive populations ==
Captive populations are subject to problems such as inbreeding depression, loss of genetic diversity and adaptations to captivity. It is important to manage captive populations in a way that minimizes these issues so that the individuals to be introduced will resemble the original founders as closely as possible, which will increase the chances of successful reintroductions. During the initial growth phase, the population size is rapidly expanded until a target population size is reached. The target population size is the number of individuals that are required to maintain appropriate levels of genetic diversity, which is generally considered to be 90% of the current genetic diversity after 100 years. The number of individuals required to meet this goal varies based on potential growth rate, effective size, current genetic diversity, and generation time. Once the target population size is reached, the focus shifts to maintaining the population and avoiding genetic issues within the captive population.

=== Minimizing mean kinship ===
Managing populations based on minimizing mean kinship values is often an effective way to increase genetic diversity and to avoid inbreeding within captive populations. Kinship is the probability that two alleles will be identical by descent when one allele is taken randomly from each mating individual. The mean kinship value is the average kinship value between a given individual and every other member of the population. Mean kinship values can help determine which individuals should be mated. In choosing individuals for breeding, it is important to choose individuals with the lowest mean kinship values because these individuals are least related to the rest of the population and have the least common alleles. This ensures that rarer alleles are passed on, which helps to increase genetic diversity. It is also important to avoid mating two individuals with very different mean kinship values because such pairings propagate both the rare alleles that are present in the individual with the low mean kinship value as well as the common alleles that are present in the individual with the high mean kinship value. This genetic management technique requires that ancestry is known, so in circumstances where ancestry is unknown, it might be necessary to use molecular genetics such as microsatellite data to help resolve unknowns.

=== Avoiding loss of genetic diversity ===
Genetic diversity is often lost within captive populations due to the founder effect and subsequent small population sizes. Minimizing the loss of genetic diversity within the captive population is an important component of ex situ conservation and is critical for successful reintroductions and the long term success of the species, since more diverse populations have higher adaptive potential. The loss of genetic diversity due to the founder effect can be minimized by ensuring that the founder population is large enough and genetically representative of the wild population. This is often difficult because removing large numbers of individuals from the wild populations may further reduce the genetic diversity of a species that is already of conservation concern. An alternative to this is collecting sperm from wild individuals and using this via artificial insemination to bring in fresh genetic material. Maximizing the captive population size and the effective population size can decrease the loss of genetic diversity by minimizing the random loss of alleles due to genetic drift. Minimizing the number of generations in captivity is another effective method for reducing the loss of genetic diversity in captive populations.

=== Avoiding adaptations to captivity ===
Selection favors different traits in captive populations than it does in wild populations, so this may result in adaptations that are beneficial in captivity but are deleterious in the wild. This reduces the success of re-introductions, so it is important to manage captive populations in order to reduce adaptations to captivity. Adaptations to captivity can be reduced by minimizing the number of generations in captivity and by maximizing the number of migrants from wild populations. Minimizing selection on captive populations by creating an environment that is similar to their natural environment is another method of reducing adaptations to captivity, but it is important to find a balance between an environment that minimizes adaptation to captivity and an environment that permits adequate reproduction. Adaptations to captivity can also be reduced by managing the captive population as a series of population fragments. In this management strategy, the captive population is split into several sub-populations or fragments which are maintained separately. Smaller populations have lower adaptive potentials, so the population fragments are less likely to accumulate adaptations associated with captivity. The fragments are maintained separately until inbreeding becomes a concern. Immigrants are then exchanged between the fragments to reduce inbreeding, and then the fragments are managed separately again.

=== Managing genetic disorders ===
Genetic disorders are often an issue within captive populations due to the fact that the populations are usually established from a small number of founders. In large, outbreeding populations, the frequencies of most deleterious alleles are relatively low, but when a population undergoes a bottleneck during the founding of a captive population, previously rare alleles may survive and increase in number. Further inbreeding within the captive population may also increase the likelihood that deleterious alleles will be expressed due to increasing homozygosity within the population. The high occurrence of genetic disorders within a captive population can threaten both the survival of the captive population and its eventual reintroduction back into the wild. If the genetic disorder is dominant, it may be possible to eliminate the disease completely in a single generation by avoiding breeding of the affected individuals. However, if the genetic disorder is recessive, it may not be possible to completely eliminate the allele due to its presence in unaffected heterozygotes. In this case, the best option is to attempt to minimize the frequency of the allele by selectively choosing mating pairs. In the process of eliminating genetic disorders, it is important to consider that when certain individuals are prevented from breeding, alleles and therefore genetic diversity are removed from the population; if these alleles are not present in other individuals, they may be lost completely. Preventing certain individuals from the breeding also reduces the effective population size, which is associated with problems such as the loss of genetic diversity and increased inbreeding.

== Examples ==
Showy Indian clover, Trifolium amoenum, is an example of a species that was thought to be extinct, but was rediscovered in 1993 in the form of a single plant at a site in western Sonoma County. Seeds were harvested and the species grown in ex situ facilities.

The Wollemi pine is another example of a plant that is being preserved via ex situ conservation, as they are being grown in nurseries to be sold to the general public.

The Orange-bellied parrot, with a wild population of 14 birds as of early February 2017, are being bred in a captive breeding program. The captive population consists of around 300 birds.

== Drawbacks ==
Ex situ conservation, while helpful in humankind's efforts to sustain and protect our environment, is rarely enough to save a species from extinction. It is to be used as a last resort, or as a supplement to in situ conservation because it cannot recreate the habitat as a whole: the entire genetic variation of a species, its symbiotic counterparts, or those elements which, over time, might help a species adapt to its changing surroundings. Instead, ex situ conservation removes the species from its natural ecological contexts, preserving it under semi-isolated conditions whereby natural evolution and adaptation processes are either temporarily halted or altered by introducing the specimen to an unnatural habitat. In the case of cryogenic storage methods, the preserved specimen's adaptation processes are (quite literally) frozen altogether. The downside to this is that, when re-released, the species may lack the genetic adaptations and mutations which would allow it to thrive in its ever-changing natural habitat.

Furthermore, ex situ conservation techniques are often costly, with cryogenic storage being economically infeasible in most cases since species stored in this manner cannot provide a profit but instead slowly drain the financial resources of the government or organization determined to operate them. Seedbanks are ineffective for certain plant genera with recalcitrant seeds that do not remain fertile for long periods of time. Diseases and pests foreign to the species, to which the species has no natural defense, may also cripple crops of protected plants in ex situ plantations and in animals living in ex situ breeding grounds. These factors, combined with the specific environmental needs of many species, some of which are nearly impossible to recreate by man, make ex situ conservation impossible for a great number of the world's endangered flora and fauna.

== See also ==
- Artificial insemination
- Asiatic cheetah
- Captive breeding
- Cloning
- Conservation biology
- Convention on Biological Diversity
- Cryoconservation of animal genetic resources
- De-extinction
- Embryo transfer
- Endangered species
- Extinct in the wild
- Frozen zoo
- Genetic erosion#Ex situ conservation
- Intracytoplasmic sperm injection
- Introduced species
- In vitro fertilisation
- IUCN Red List
- List of animals that have been cloned
- List of introduced species
- Pleistocene Park
- Reintroduction
- Wildlife conservation
- World Conservation Union (IUCN)
