= Genetic resources =

Biological material containing genes

Genetic resources are genetic material of actual or potential value, where genetic material means any material of plant, animal, microbial or other origin containing functional units of heredity. Genetic resources is one of the three levels of biodiversity defined by the Convention on Biological Diversity in Rio, 1992.

== Examples ==
- Animal genetic resources for food and agriculture
- Forest genetic resources
- Germplasm, genetic resources that are preserved for various purposes such as breeding, preservation, and research
- Plant genetic resources
- Genetic resources conservation and sustainable use

== See also ==
- Cryoconservation of animal genetic resources, a strategy to preserve genetic resources cryogenically
- Commission on Genetic Resources for Food and Agriculture, the only permanent intergovernmental body that addresses biological diversity for food and agriculture
- International Treaty on Plant Genetic Resources for Food and Agriculture, an international agreement to promote sustainable use of the world's plant genetic resources
- Gene bank, a type of biorepository which preserves genetic material
- Genetic diversity
- The State of the World's Animal Genetic Resources for Food and Agriculture
