= Geoffrey Hawtin =

2024 World Food Prize Laureate

Geoffrey Hawtin OBE
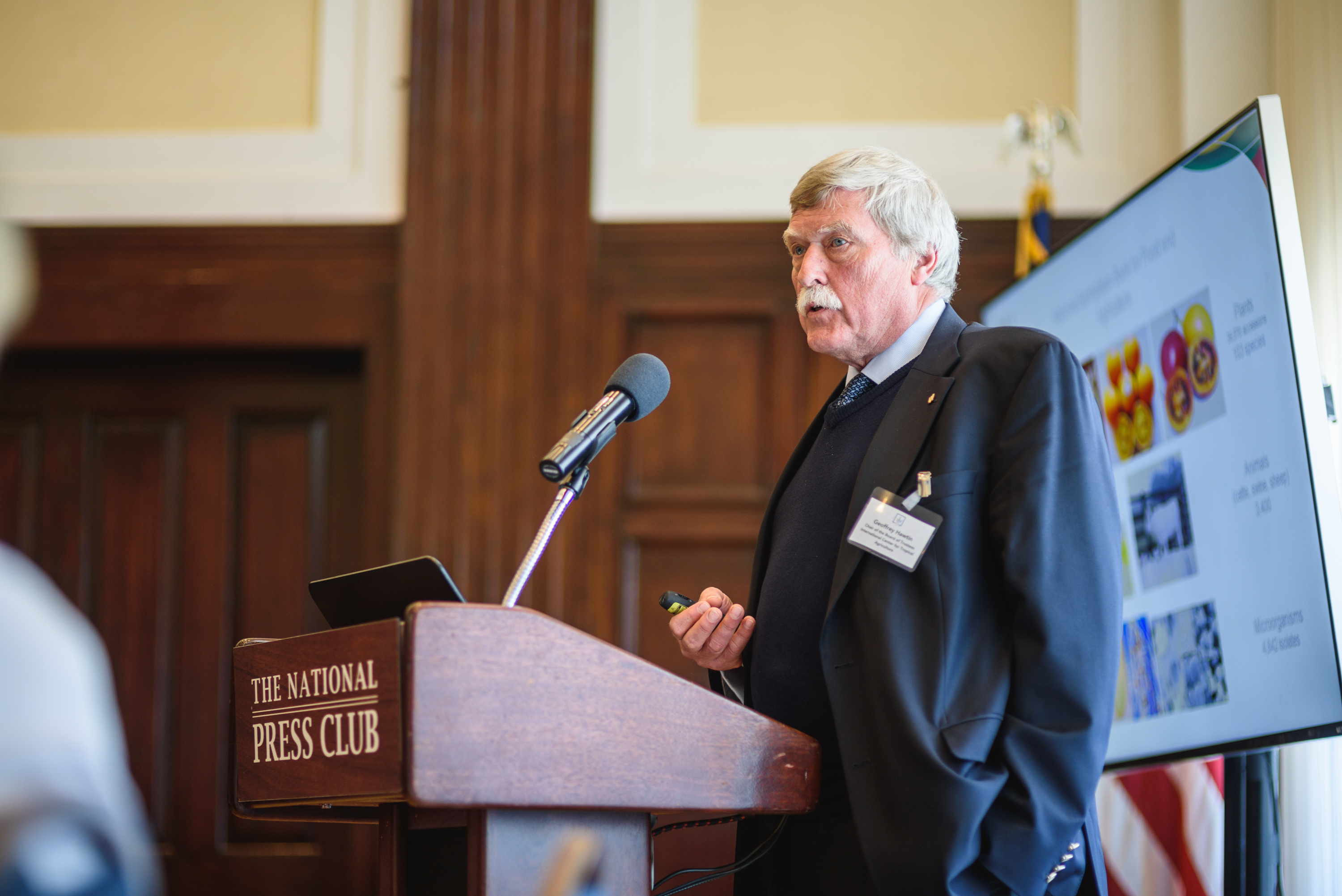
- Dr Geoffrey Hawtin speaks at the Crop Trust's 2016 International Pledging Conference in Washington D.C.
- Born: Geoffrey Hawtin; 1949 (age 76–77); Chipping Norton, Oxfordshire, United Kingdom
- Citizenship: British and Canadian
- Education: Cambridge University
- Known for: Svalbard Global Seed Vault, Crop Trust, International Treaty on Plant Genetic Resources for Food and Agriculture
- Awards: World Food Prize, Frank Meyer Medal for Plant Genetic Resources, Order of the British Empire

Geoffrey Charles Hawtin OBE (b. 16 March 1949) is an agricultural scientist and World Food Prize laureate who has served in public institutions working in agricultural biodiversity, plant genetic resources, crop breeding and research management. He was awarded an OBE by Queen Elizabeth II and has been recognized for his career "dedicated to using agriculture as a weapon in the war against poverty in developing countries." He played key roles in the creation of the Svalbard Global Seed Vault and the negotiation of the International Treaty on Plant Genetic Resources. He has headed two CGIAR Research Centers and currently is on the Executive Board of the Crop Trust.

Hawtin and Cary Fowler were named as the 2024 World Food Prize laureates for their leadership in preserving and protecting crop biodiversity.

== Education ==
Hawtin was born in Chipping Norton, Oxfordshire and attended William Ellis School in Parliament Hill. He grew up in the city but developed his interest in agriculture by working on farms during the summer.

He obtained both his MA and PhD from Magdalene College, Cambridge. He conducted his doctoral thesis research on genetic variation in soybean at Makerere University in Uganda.

== Career ==
=== International Center for Agricultural Research in the Dry Areas (ICARDA) ===
After completing his PhD, Hawtin began working as a plant breeder with the Arid Lands Agricultural Development (ALAD) Program, the forerunner of the International Center for Agricultural Research in the Dry Areas (ICARDA). In 1976 he was appointed the first, and youngest, leader of ICARDA's Food Legume Improvement Programme and initiated international breeding programs on chickpea (Cicer arietinum), lentil (Lens culinaris) and faba bean (Vicia faba). He initiated work on winter sown chickpeas for the Mediterranean region, which led to increased cold tolerance and Ascochyta blight resistance.

To assemble the genetic variation needed for his breeding work, Hawtin spent a considerable time in his early career, together with his ICARDA research team collecting, preserving and protecting legume crops from Afghanistan, Ethiopia, Lebanon, Jordan, Syria and Turkey. These collections became the core of the legume collection in ICARDA's genebank. When civil war broke out in Lebanon in 1975, he and his team were responsible for moving seed collections to safety in Syria. They travelled five times along a mined road before there were able to get the genebank collection to safety.

In 1981, the 32-year-old Hawtin was appointed the Deputy Director General of ICARDA in Syria.

=== International Development Research Center (IDRC) ===
As the Director of the Agriculture of the Food and Nutrition Sciences Division of the International Development Research Center (IDRC), Canada he oversaw 400 projects in more than 70 countries. He was involved in establishing the International Network for the Improvement of Banana and Plantain (INIBAP), both overseeing IDRC's role as implementing agency and chairing the Donor Support Group.

=== International Plant Genetic Resources Institute (IPGRI) ===
As the Director General of the International Plant Genetic Resources Institute (IGPRI, now The Alliance of Bioversity International and CIAT) in Rome from 1991 to 2003 he negotiated an agreement with the FAO to place the germplasm collections of CGIAR in trust for the benefit of the world community. The move fostered good faith and cooperation among CGIAR, nongovernmental organizations and indigenous communities. He also served as a leader of the CGIAR delegation to the negotiations of the International Treaty on Plant Genetic Resources, which was agreed upon in 2001.

=== Crop Trust ===
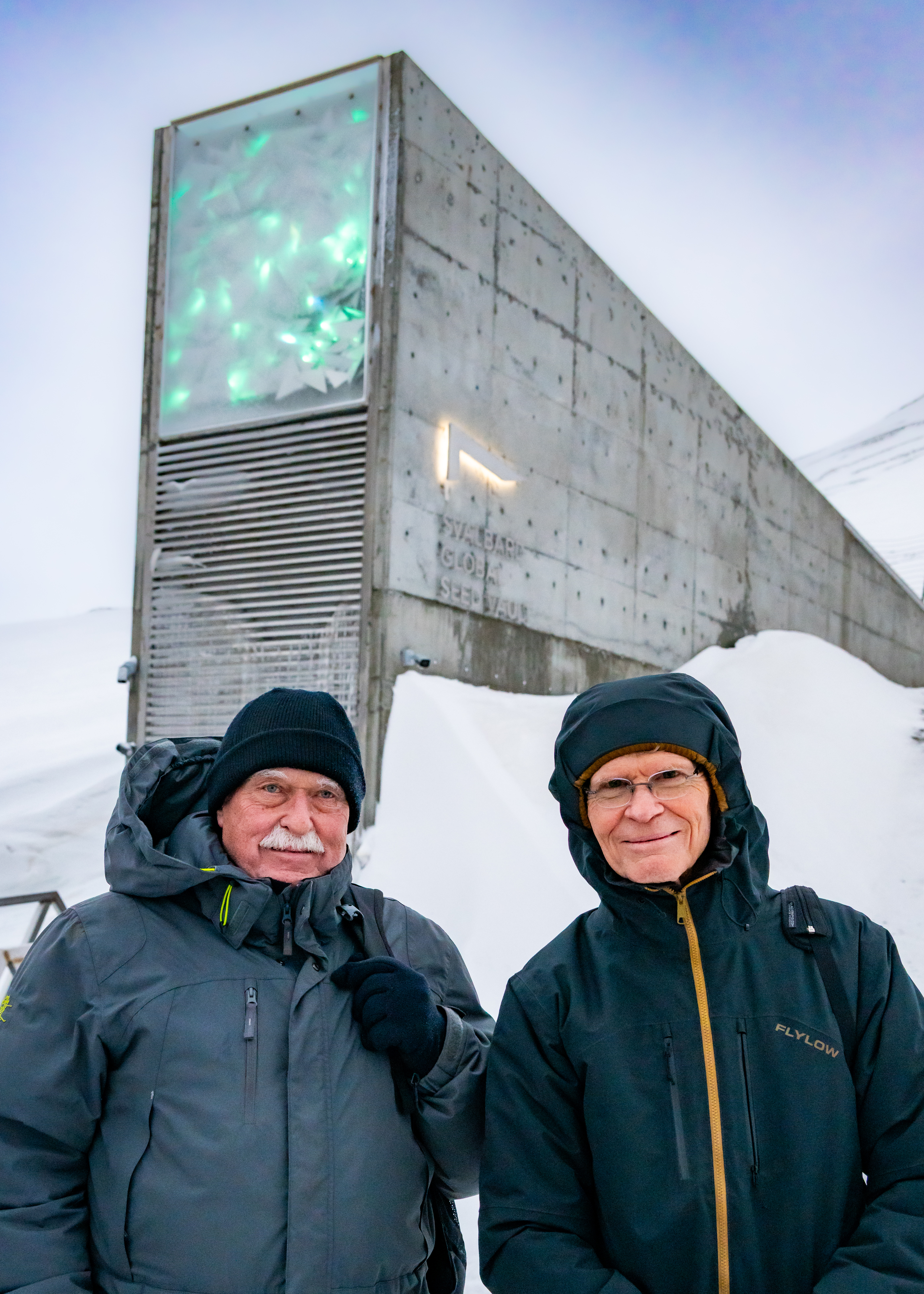
Geoff Hawtin (left) and Cary Fowler at the Svalbard Global Seed Vault, February 2025

While at IPGRI, Hawtin led the conception, design and establishment of the Global Crop Diversity Trust and served as its first CEO from 2003 to 2005.

In 2004, Hawtin joined a team to investigate the feasibility of establishing the Svalbard Global Seed Vault on the Norwegian island of Spitzbergen. In 2006, the Norwegian Government contracted him to develop technical, management and policy specifications for the Seed Vault.

=== Centro Internacional de Agricultura Tropical (CIAT) ===
He was the Interim Director General of the Centro Internacional de Agricultura Tropical (CIAT) in Colombia from 2008 to 2009 and was at the forefront of transformative tropical agricultural research. His tenure was marked by his focus on prioritizing the sustainability, productivity and profitability of smallholder farming systems.

=== Boards of Trustees ===
Hawtin has served on several boards of trustees of non-governmental organizations dedicated to agricultural research or crop diversity:

- Royal Botanical Gardens, Kew
- Bioversity International, Rome
- CATIE, Costa Rica (president)
- CIAT, Colombia (chair)
- Alliance of Bioversity and CIAT (co-chair)
- Crop Trust (current).

He has authored or co-authored more than 100 scientific and technical publications.

== Awards and honors ==
1995. "Correspondant étranger" of the Académie d'Agriculture of France

2005. Frank Meyer Medal for Plant Genetic Resources by the Crop Science Society of America

2017. Appointed Officer of the Order of the British Empire (OBE) in the 2017 Birthday Honours for "services to global agrobiodiversity conservation, subsistence livelihood enhancement and sustainable food programmes"

2021. Tropical Agriculture Association's Development Agriculturalist of the Year Award "for leadership in development and implementation of plant genetic resources policy and establishment of institutions for germplasm research and conservation to safeguard global food security"

2024. World Food Prize with Cary Fowler for "their extraordinary leadership in preserving and protecting the world's heritage of crop biodiversity and mobilizing this critical resource to defend against threats to global food security"

== Personal life ==
Hawtin married Lorna Carol Dixie in 1973. They have three children.
