= Nordic Genetic Resource Center =

NordGen, Nordic Genetic Resource Center
- Nordiskt Genresurscenter (Scandinavian)
- Former names: Nordic Gene Bank merged with Nordic Gene Bank Farm Animals and Nordic Council for Forest Reproductive Material

Website
- Official website

The Nordic Genetic Resource Center (NordGen; Scandinavian: Nordiskt Genresurscenter) is a plant, farm animal and forest conservation, gene resource guardian, and sustainable use organization under and primarily financed by the Nordic Council of Ministers, and is headquartered in Alnarp, near Malmö, in southern Sweden. NordGen's primary mission is "securing the broad diversity of genetic resources linked to food and agriculture" through "conservation and sustainable use, solid documentation and information work and international agreements".

== History ==
In January 2008, as a culmination of a quarter century of cooperation by Nordic nations on genetic resource conservation, NordGen was created from a merger among 3 organizations, the Nordic Gene Bank, the Nordic Gene Bank Farm Animals and the Nordic Council for Forest Reproductive Material. Besides NordGen as the new parent organization and primarily successor to the Nordic Gene Bank, NordGen Plants is in Alnarp, near Malmö, in southern Sweden, NordGen Farm Animals and NordGen Forest are in Ås, near Oslo, in Norway.

NordGen notes that the high cost of its missions prompted a joint Nordic nation solution, while each nation simultaneously maintains its own national programs as well.

== Projects ==
NordGen leads, participates in, and collaborates with genebanks, research organizations, pre-breeding centers and breeding centers at the global level as well as in the Nordic region. NordGen has extensive United Nations Food and Agriculture Organization (FAO), Bioversity International and the Crop Trust collaborations.

Here are key NordGen international projects:

=== Svalbard Global Seed Vault ===
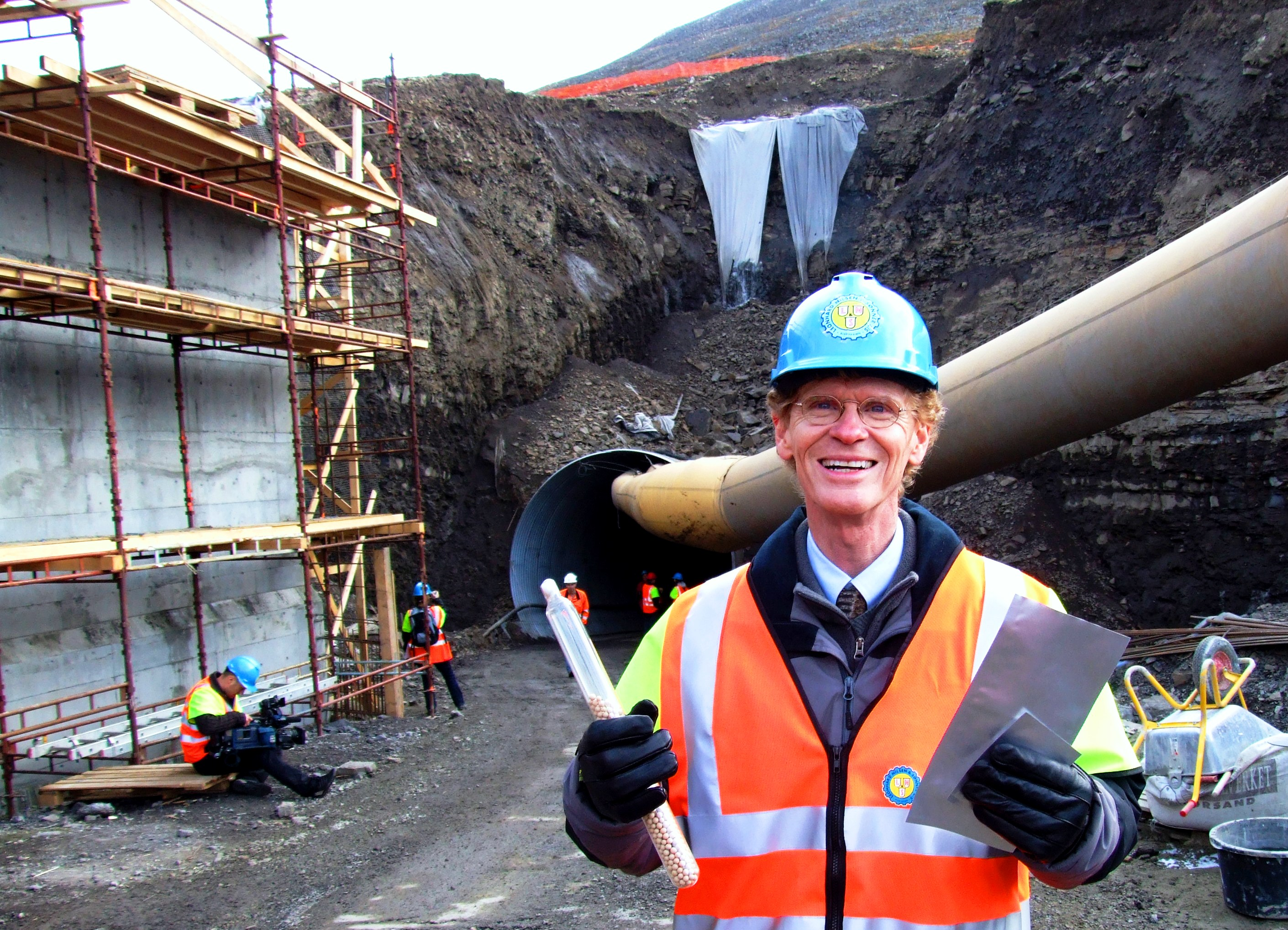
Cary Fowler at the Seed Vault during its construction

The Svalbard Global Seed Vault (SGSV) owned by the government of Norway, was inspired by a safety store NordGen had placed in a former Svalbard coal mine. Food and Agriculture Organization (FAO) and Bioversity International approached Norwegian authorities to open a comprehensive facility and the Svalbard Global Seed Vault began, in 2008, to be the safety store of Earth's most important crops for human and human-mediated agriculture and consumption.

Norway, Sweden, Finland, Denmark, and Iceland's prime ministers ceremonially laid "the first stone" on 19 June 2006.

The Vault is managed through a tripartite agreement among the Norwegian Ministry of Agriculture and Food, the Crop Trust and NordGen. Nordgen provides operational management and Vault deposits in collaboration with depositing genebanks and the Crop Trust which co-funds Vault operations and funds seed shipment from developing countries to the Vault in Svalbard.

=== European collaboration (Plants) ===
The European Programme for Plant Genetic Resources (ECPGR) in which NordGen participates is a European gene bank collaboration whose working groups include the development of AEGIS, a virtual gene bank which serves as a tool for guaranteeing, rationalizing and coordinating European gene bank material quality.

=== Nordic research on climate change (Farm Animals) ===
AnGR-NordicNET is a Nordic research network being established by five Nordic nations as a knowledge base for decision makers and fostering of strategies regarding climate change effects on farm animal genetic resources.

=== North West Russia (Plants) ===
The N.I. Vavilov Institute of Plant Industry (VIR), a Russian national genebank, cooperates with NordGen, as the VIR preserves plant genetic resources salient to Nordic ecozones, such as traditional landraces of all collected Nordic crop groups prior to NordGen's existence.

=== The Baltic countries (Plants) ===
Baltic Sea region plant genetic resources are the subject of sustainable conservation workshop series led by NordGen.
