= Seed bank =

Backup seed storage

Number of accessions of plant genetic resources secured in conservation facilities

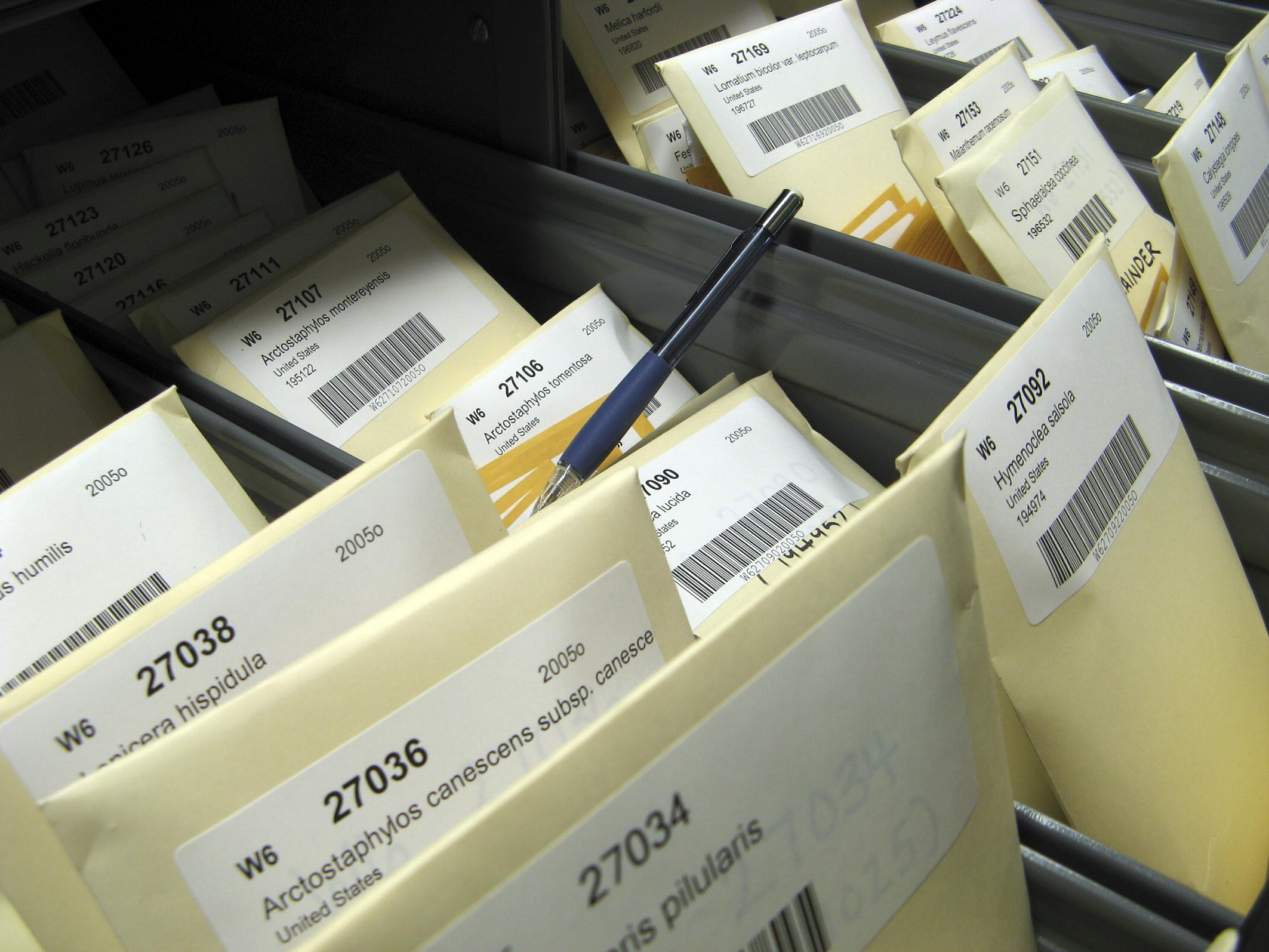
Seedbank at the USDA Western Regional Plant Introduction Station

A seed bank (also seed banks, seeds bank or seed vault) stores seeds to preserve genetic diversity; hence it is a type of gene bank. There are many reasons to store seeds. One is to preserve the genes that plant breeders need to increase yield, disease resistance, drought tolerance, nutritional quality, taste, etc. of crops. Another is to forestall loss of genetic diversity in rare or imperiled plant species in an effort to conserve biodiversity ex situ. Many plants that were used centuries ago by humans are used less frequently now; seed banks offer a way to preserve that historical and cultural value. Collections of seeds stored at constant low temperature and low moisture are guarded against loss of genetic resources that are otherwise maintained in situ or in field collections. These alternative "living" collections can be damaged by natural disasters, outbreaks of disease, or war. Seed banks are considered seed libraries, containing valuable information about evolved strategies to combat plant stress, and can be used to create genetically modified versions of existing seeds. The work of seed banks often span decades and even centuries. Most seed banks are publicly funded and seeds are usually available for research that benefits the public.

== Seed hunting ==
Seed hunting is a well known method by tribals of India and Asian countries that help in search, collection, and preservation of seeds from native, rare, endangered, or sacred plants to protect biodiversity and secure future plant resources. This practice has long been followed by many indigenous and tribal communities such as Gond, Munda, Santhal, Paharia and orthers of Bihar, Jharkhand, Chhattisgarh, Madhya Pradesh, and Arunachal Pradesh, who conserve valuable species through indigenous knowledge and folk practices. Yellow Palash and Agarwood are among the important examples associated with this method. Seed hunting plays a significant role in protecting biodiversity, conserving native and endemic plant species, and promoting the sustainable development of forests.

== Storage conditions and regeneration ==
Seeds are living plants and keeping them viable over the long term requires adjusting storage moisture and temperature appropriately. As they mature on the mother plant, many seeds attain an innate ability to survive drying. Survival of these so-called 'orthodox' seeds can be extended by dry, low temperature storage. The level of dryness and coldness depends mostly on the longevity that is required and the investment in infrastructure that is affordable. Practical guidelines from a US scientist in the 1950s and 1960s, James Harrington, are known as 'Thumb Rules'. The 'Hundreds Rule' guides that the sum of relative humidity and temperature (in Fahrenheit) should be less than 100 for the sample to survive five years. Another rule is that reduction of water content by 1% or temperature by 10 °F (5.6 °C) will double the seed life span. Research from the 1990s showed that there is a limit to the beneficial effect of drying or cooling, so it must not be overdone.

Understanding the effect of water content and temperature on seed longevity, the Food and Agriculture division of the United Nations and a consultancy group called Bioversity International developed a set of standards for international seed banks to preserve seed longevity. The document advocates drying seeds to about 20% relative humidity, sealing seeds in high quality moisture-proof containers, and storing seeds at −20 °C (−4 °F). These conditions are frequently referred to as 'conventional' storage protocols. Seeds from species considered most important – corn, wheat, rice, soybean, pea, tomato, broccoli, melon, sunflower, etc. are stored in this way. However, there are many species that produce seeds that do not survive the drying or low temperature of conventional storage protocols. These species must be stored cryogenically. Seeds of citrus fruits, coffee, avocado, cocoa, coconut, papaya, oak, walnut and willow are a few examples of species that should be preserved cryogenically.

Like everything, seeds eventually degrade with time. It is hard to predict when seeds lose viability and so most reputable seed banks monitor germination potential during storage. When seed germination percentage decreases below a prescribed amount, the seeds need to be replanted and fresh seeds collected for another round of long-term storage.

Seeds banks may operate in much more primitive conditions if the aim is only to maintain year-by-year seed supplies and lower costs for farmers in a particular area.

== Challenges ==
One of the greatest challenges for seed banks is selection. Collections must be relevant and that means they must provide useful genetic diversity that is accessible to the public. Collections must also be efficient and that means they must not duplicate materials already in collections.

Keeping seeds alive for hundreds of years is the next biggest challenge. Orthodox seeds are amenable to 'conventional' storage protocols but there are many seed types that must be stored using nonconventional methods. Technology for these methods is rapidly advancing; local institutional infrastructure may be lacking.

Some seeds cannot be kept alive in storage and must be regenerated – planted to produce a new quantity of seeds to be stored for another length of time. Parzies et al. 2000 found that this reduced the effective population size and alleles were lost. Parzies' finding has since been taken seriously by banks around the world and has sparked further verification – regeneration is widely recognized to not preserve diversity perfectly.

== Alternatives ==
In-situ conservation of seed-producing plant species is another conservation strategy. In-situ conservation involves the creation of National Parks, National Forests, and National Wildlife Refuges as a way of preserving the natural habitat of the targeted seed-producing organisms. This also allows the plants to continue to evolve with their environment through natural selection. In-situ conservation of agricultural resources is performed on-farm.

An arboretum stores trees by planting them at a protected site.

A less expensive, community-supported seed library can save local genetic material.

The phenomenon of seeds remaining dormant within the soil is well known and documented (Hills and Morris 1992). Detailed information on the role of such "soil seed banks" in northern Ontario, however, is extremely limited, and research is required to determine the species and abundance of seeds in the soil across a range of forest types, as well as to determine the function of the seed bank in post-disturbance vegetation dynamics. Comparison tables of seed density and diversity are presented for the boreal and deciduous forest types and the research that has been conducted is discussed. This review includes detailed discussions of: (1) seed bank dynamics, (2) physiology of seeds in a seed bank, (3) boreal and deciduous forest seed banks, (4) seed bank dynamics and succession, and (5) recommendations for initiating a seed bank study in northern Ontario.

== Longevity ==
Seeds may be viable for hundreds and even thousands of years. The oldest carbon-14-dated seed that has grown into a viable plant was a Judean date palm seed about 2,000 years old, recovered from excavations at the palace of Herod the Great in Israel.

In February 2012, Russian scientists announced they had regenerated a narrow leaf campion (Silene stenophylla) from a 32,000-year-old seed. The seed was found in a burrow 124 feet (38 m) under Siberian permafrost along with 800,000 other seeds. Seed tissue was grown in test tubes until it could be transplanted to soil. This exemplifies the long-term viability of DNA under proper conditions.

== Climate change ==
Conservation efforts such as seed banks are expected to play a greater role as climate change progresses. Seed banks offer communities a source of climate-resilient seeds to withstand changing local climates. As challenges arise from climate change, community based seed banks can improve access to a diverse selection of locally adapted crops while also enhancing indigenous understandings of plant management such as seed selection, treatment, storage, and distribution.

== Facilities ==
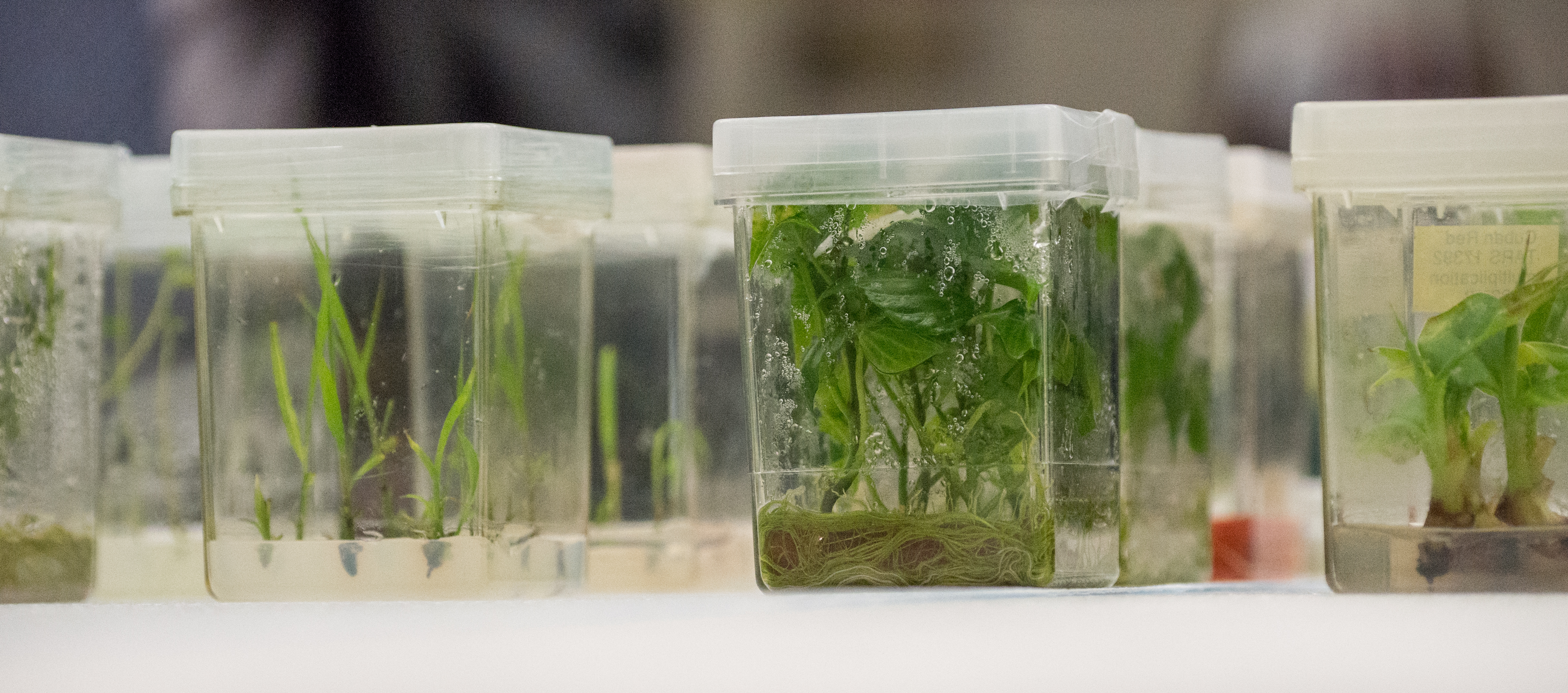
Plant tissue cultures being grown at a USDA seed bank, the National Center for Genetic Resources Preservation

There are about 6 million accessions, or samples of a particular population, stored as seeds in about 1,300 genebanks throughout the world as of 2006. This amount represents a small fraction of the world's biodiversity, and many regions of the world have not been fully explored.

- The Svalbard Global Seed Vault has been built inside a sandstone mountain in a man-made tunnel on the frozen Norwegian island of Spitsbergen, which is part of the Svalbard archipelago, about 1,307 kilometres (812 mi) from the North Pole. It is designed to survive catastrophes such as nuclear war and world war. It is operated by the Global Crop Diversity Trust. The area's permafrost will keep the vault below the freezing point of water, and the seeds are protected by 1-metre thick walls of steel-reinforced concrete. There are two airlocks and two blast-proof doors. The vault accepted the first seeds on 26 February 2008.
- The Millennium Seed Bank is located in the grounds of Wakehurst Place in West Sussex, near London, UK. Established in 1996, it is the largest seed bank in the world (and will longterm be at least 100 times bigger than Svalbard Global Seed Vault), providing space for the storage of billions of seed samples in a nuclear bomb proof multi-story underground vault. Its ultimate aim being to store every plant species possible. It is already (2024) home to over 2.4 billion seeds, representing over 39,000 different species of the world’s storable seeds. Importantly they also distribute seeds to other key locations around the world, do germination tests on each species every 10 years, and other important research.
- The Institute of Plant Genetic Resource in Saint Petersburg, Russia is probably the oldest and still one of the 5-6 largest in the world. It was started in 1924 by Russian geneticist and botanist Nikolai Vavilov and survived the 28-month Siege of Leningrad in World War II because several botanists starved to death rather than eat the collected seeds and potatoes. Some authorities attribute the foundation of this seed bank to Alexander Batalin in 1894.
- The Australian PlantBank is located in the Australian Botanic Gardens, Mount Annan, New South Wales. It is part of the Millennium Seed Bank Project in London and incorporates the former NSW Seedbank, established in 1986 to preserve native Australian flora, especially NSW threatened species.
  - The Australian Grains Genebank (AGG), in Horsham, Victoria, Australia, is a national center for storing genetic material for plant breeding and research. The Genebank is in a collaboration with the Australian Seed Bank Partnership on an Australian Crop Wild Relatives project. It was officially opened in March 2014 The primary reason for the bank to be created was the extreme temperatures in the area, up to 40 °C (104 °F) in the summer time. Because of that they had to ensure the protection of the grains all year around. The Genebank aims to collect and conserve the seeds of Australian crop wild species, that are not yet adequately represented in existing collections.
  - The George Hulbert Seed Vault in Wagga Wagga, New South Wales, Australia, is dedicated to the preservation of rice varieties, including some predating the Green Revolution.
- Indian Seed Vault is a secure seed bank located in a high-altitude mountain pass on the Chang La in Ladakh, India. It was built in 2010 and is claimed to be the second largest in the world.
  - The BBA (Beej Bachao Andolan — Save the Seeds movement) began in the late 1980s in Uttarakhand, India, led by Vijay Jardhari. Seed banks were created to store native varieties of seeds.
- The National Center for Genetic Resources Preservation, in Fort Collins, Colorado, is the largest seed bank in the United States.
  - Desert Legume Program (DELEP) in Tucson, Arizona, focuses on wild species of plants in the legume family (Fabaceae), specifically legumes from dry regions around the world. The DELEP seed bank currently has over 3,600 seed collections representing nearly 1,400 species of arid land legumes originating in 65 countries on six continents. It is backed up (at least in part) in National Center for Genetic Resources Preservation, and in the Svalbard Global Seed Vault. The DELEP seed bank is an accredited collection of the North American Plant Conservation Consortium.
- The National Gene Bank of Plants of Ukraine was created in the 1990s in Ukraine. Described as one of the largest seed banks in the world, it was damaged during the Russian invasion of Ukraine in 2022 but survived in substantial part.
- The INRAE Centre for Vegetable Germplasm in Avignon, France stores over 10,000 species of five vegetable crops as seeds: aubergine (eggplant), pepper, tomato, melon and lettuce collections, together with their wild or cultivated relatives. Species from the collections have geographically diverse origins, are generally well-described and fixed for traits of agronomic or scientific interest, and have available passport data.
- Meise Botanical Garden houses a seed bank in Belgium. Among other things, it aims to preserve endangered and rare wild species of Belgian flora.It also includes wild beans, wild bananas and seeds of the Copper plants of Katanga.

== Seed banks classification ==
Seed banks can be classified in three main profiles: assistentialist, productivist or preservationist. In practice, many seed banks have a combination of these three main types, and they may have different priorities depending on the context and goals of the seed bank.

1. Assistentialist seed banks: These seed banks primarily aim to support the needs of local communities and small-scale farmers. They focus on providing seed samples that are well-suited to local conditions and are easy to grow and maintain. They prioritize seed samples that have high yield potential, are pest and disease resistant, and can be grown with minimal inputs.
2. Productivist seed banks: These seed banks primarily aim to support large-scale agricultural production and commercial farming. They focus on providing seed samples that have high yield potential, are pest and disease resistant, and can be grown with minimal inputs. They prioritize seed samples that are well-suited to large-scale mechanized farming and can be grown in large quantities.
3. Preservationist seed banks: These seed banks primarily aim to conserve the genetic diversity of wild and domesticated plant species. They focus on preserving the genetic diversity of plant species, and make seed samples available for research and breeding programs. They prioritize seed samples that are rare, endangered, or have unique genetic characteristics.

Seed banks classification by profile
Profile	Assitentialist	Productivist	Preservationist
Objective	Conserve varieties of seeds in case they need to be used in coming harvests	Conserve varieties of seeds to contribute to the improvement of current crops by crossing them with those seeds	Preserve varieties of seeds in case they are destroyed by either man or natural events.
Functioning	The bank provides seeds to farmers who lack them	The bank makes its seeds available to produce new crops of agricultural interest from these seeds	The bank does not offer its seeds but it safeguards them

== Early concepts ==
In Zoroastrian mythology, Ahura Mazda instructed Yima, a legendary king of ancient Persia, to build an underground structure called a Vara to store two seeds from every kind of plant in the known world. The seeds had to come from plant specimens that were free of defects, and the structure itself had to withstand a 300-year apocalyptic winter. Some scholars have suggested that the Norse equivalent of this myth is the underground garden Odainsaker, which was intended to withstand the three-year fimbul winter preceding Ragnarok, to protect the people (and seemingly the plants) that would repopulate the world after this event.

== See also ==
- Agroecology
- Biodiversity banking
- Conservation movement
- Gene bank
- Gene pool
- Germplasm
- Heirloom plant
- Index Seminum
- International Treaty on Plant Genetic Resources for Food and Agriculture
- Knowledge ark
- List of conservation topics
- Millennium Seed Bank Partnership
- Orthodox seed
- Recalcitrant seed
- Seed company
- Seed library
- Seed saving
- Seed swap
- Soil seed bank
