= National Gene Bank of Plants of Ukraine =

National Gene Bank of Plants of Ukraine (Ukrainian: Національний Центр генетичних ресурсів рослин України, romanized: Natsionalnyi Tsentr henetychnykh resursiv roslyn Ukrainy) is a Ukrainian gene bank (seed bank) located in Kharkiv.

The bank was created in 1990s as part of the Plant Genetic Resources of Ukraine (PGRU) project, an initiative of the Ukrainian Academy of Agrarian Sciences (and supervised by the Plant Production Institute named after V.Ya. Yuriev). By early 2021 it has collected 151,300 specimens belonging to 544 crops and 1,802 species of plants. In terms of its volume and diversity, the Gene Bank was one of the 10 largest gene banks in the world. In mid-May 2022, during the Russian invasion of Ukraine, the bank was reported destroyed by the Russians. It was later clarified that the facility had been bombed, and that two or three dozen thousand samples destroyed only represented a small fraction of the collection, and the majority of the collection was still being protected in an underground warehouse.
