= Indian Seed Vault =

Secure seed bank

- Location within Ladakh Location within India

General information
- Type: Seed bank
- Location: Himalaya, Chang La, Ladakh, India
- Coordinates: 34°02′49″N 77°55′50″E
- Elevation: 17,300 ft (5,300 m)
- Opened: 2010
- Owner: Indian Government

The Indian Seed Vault is a secure seed bank located in a high-altitude mountain pass on the Chang La in Ladakh, India. It was built in 2010 jointly by the Defence Institute of High Altitude Research and the National Bureau of Plant Genetic Resources, and is the second largest seed bank in the world.

== History ==
In the late 1980s, the movement was initiated by the group of activists of Hemwal Valley of Tehri and led by a farmer and social activist Vijay Jardhari. ‘Beej Bachao Andolan’ (Save the Seeds Movement) was started from Jardhargaon of Tehri district, Uttarakhand.

The Indian Seed Vault was established in 2010 through a collaboration between the Defence Institute of High Altitude Research (DIHAR) and the 'National Bureau of Plant Genetic Resources (NBPGR) to secure India’s crop diversity in extreme environmental conditions. It serves as a backup for more than 5,000 seed accessions.

== Seed storage ==
The Indian Seed Bank was carved into a granite outcrop at Chang La. The vaulted chamber is insulated naturally by subzero temperatures, and contains steel racks and hermetically sealed cryotanks. The vault stores over 10,000 seeds and 200 plant species. These seeds include apricots, barley, cabbage, carrots, radish, potatoes, tomatoes, rice, and wheat, chosen based on qualities such as yield or resistance to temperature, pests and humidity. A solar‑powered generator and back‑up diesel engine maintain a constant –18 °C internal environment, while all access and monitoring systems including RFID‑tagged seed packets and remote‑sensing alarms are duplicated at the low‑land National Genebank in New Delhi to guard against loss.

== See also ==
- Svalbard Global Seed Vault
