= Crop Trust =

Germany-based nonprofit organization

The Crop Trust
- Founded: 2004; 22 years ago
- Type: Non-profit NGO
- Purpose: agricultural biodiversity, conservation, food security, genebanks
- Headquarters: Bonn, Germany
- Region served: Worldwide
- Key people: Stefan Schmitz (Executive Director), Catherine Bertini (Chair of the Executive Board)
- Website: croptrust.org

The Crop Trust, officially known as the Global Crop Diversity Trust, is an international nonprofit organization with a secretariat in Bonn, Germany. Its mission is to conserve and make available the world's crop diversity for food security.

Established in 2004, the Crop Trust is the only organization whose sole mission is to safeguard the world's crop diversity for future food security. Through an endowment fund for crop diversity, the Crop Trust provides financial support for key international and national genebanks that hold collections of diversity for food crops available under the International Treaty for Plant Genetic Resources for Food and Agriculture (ITPGRFA). The organization also provides tools and support for the efficient management of genebanks, facilitates coordination between conserving institutions, and organizes final backup of crop seeds in the Svalbard Global Seed Vault.

Since its establishment, the Crop Trust has raised more than US$300 million for the Crop Diversity Endowment Fund and supports conservation work in over 80 countries.

== Mission ==
Crop diversity is the biological foundation of agriculture, and is the raw material plant breeders and farmers use to adapt crop varieties to pests and diseases. In the future, this crop diversity will play a central role in helping agriculture adjust to climate change and adapt to water and energy constraints.

== History ==
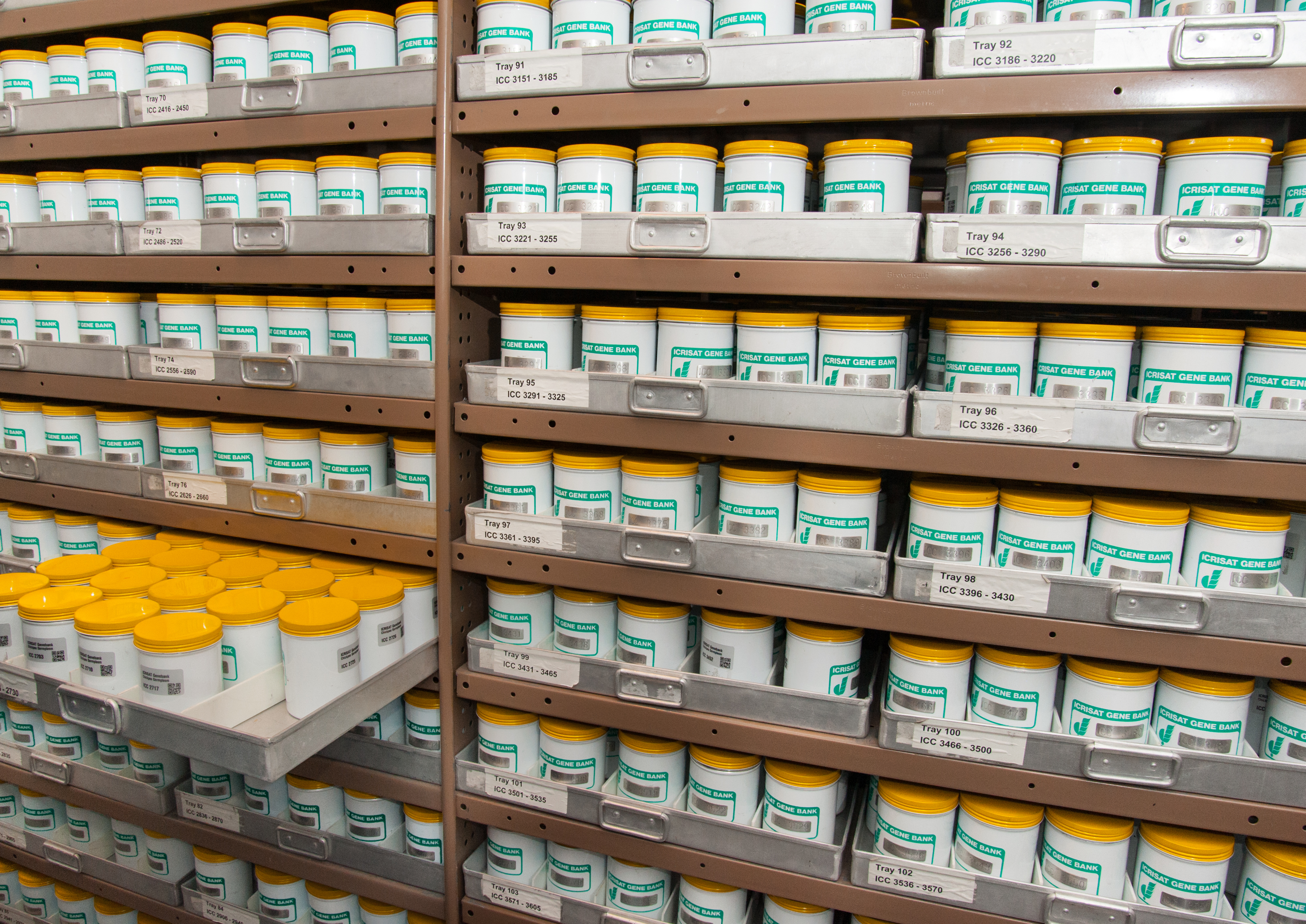
The Crop Trust provides financial support for key international and national genebanks that hold collections of diversity for food crops such as this genebank at ICRISAT in India.

In 1996, the UN Food and Agriculture Organization (FAO) recognized the need for global coordination for the conservation of the world's crop diversity. At a conference organized by the FAO, 150 countries launched a Global Plan of Action to coordinate efforts at halting the loss of the world's agrobiodiversity. The Global Plan of Action formed a major pillar of what would become the International Treaty on Plant Genetic Resources for Food and Agriculture, known as the Plant Treaty. The Plant Treaty brings the diversity of 64 food and forage crops into a multilateral system where the genetic material is protected and accessible to all who need it. To protect the collections that housed that genetic material, however, a stable system of funding was needed.

To partly address this need, the Crop Trust was established in October 2004. Its mission was to help build a global system of ex situ crop diversity conservation, funded through an endowment for crop diversity. The Plant Treaty recognizes the endowment fund as an essential element of its funding strategy and confirms the autonomy of the Crop Trust as a scientific organization in raising and disbursing funds. Geoff Hawtin was appointed the Interim Executive Director of the new organization, housed at the FAO headquarters in Rome, Italy.

The Crop Trust began its work gathering contributions for the endowment fund from various foundations, corporations, and governments that had ratified the Plant Treaty. In 2007, the Crop Trust signed its first long-term grant agreement with the International Rice Research Institute (IRRI) in Los Baños, Philippines.

In 2005, Cary Fowler was appointed the first permanent Crop Trust Executive Director. Under Fowler's leadership, the Crop Trust initiated the Global System Project and joined the three-party management agreement for the Svalbard Global Seed Vault, which opened in 2008 as a partnership between the Crop Trust, the Ministry of Agriculture and Food of Norway, and the Nordic Genetic Resource Center (NordGen). In 2011, the Crop Trust launched the Crop Wild Relatives Project, a 10-year project to collect and conserve crop wild relatives, a project funded by the Government of Norway.

In 2012, the Crop Trust appointed Marie Haga as the new Crop Trust Executive Director. A new target for the Crop Trust endowment fund was set at US$850 million to finance a global system for the conservation of crop diversity, centered around key international, regional and national collections, as well as the Svalbard Global Seed Vault.

In 2013, the Crop Trust opened its new headquarters in Bonn, Germany, through a hosting agreement with the Government of Germany. Shortly thereafter, the Crop Trust launched the five-year CGIAR Genebank CRP, taking on financial responsibility and oversight for the 11 CGIAR genebanks. In 2017, the CGIAR Genebank Platform replaced the Genebank CRP program and the Food Forever Initiative was launched to raise awareness of efforts to achieve Target 2.5 of the United Nations Sustainable Development Goals.

In 2018, the Crop Trust signed the first long-term funding agreement with the IRRI genebank, pledging to fully fund essential operations in perpetuity. The Crop Trust celebrated its 15th anniversary in 2019 and crossed the US$300 million threshold in the endowment fund.

In 2020, Stefan Schmitz was appointed Executive Director. With support from the German government, the Crop Trust launched the Seeds4Resilience Project in 2020. The project will upgrade five national genebanks in sub-Saharan Africa. In February 2020, the Svalbard Global Seed Vault reached one million accessions of seed samples for more than 6,000 species.

== Management ==
The Crop Trust is headquartered in Bonn, Germany, after relocating there from Rome, Italy.

The executive board is chaired by Catherine Bertini. The Crop Trust's Donors' Council is chaired by Dr. Taek-Ryoun Kwon of South Korea.

Main donors include: Australia, Canada, Germany, Ireland, Norway, Sweden, Switzerland, United Kingdom, United States, the Bill and Melinda Gates Foundation, and the Grains Research and Development Corporation (Australia). A number of developing countries have also provided support, including Egypt, Ethiopia and India. Further contributions have been received from private corporations, foundations, industry associations, and from private individuals.

== Leadership ==
=== Executive Director ===
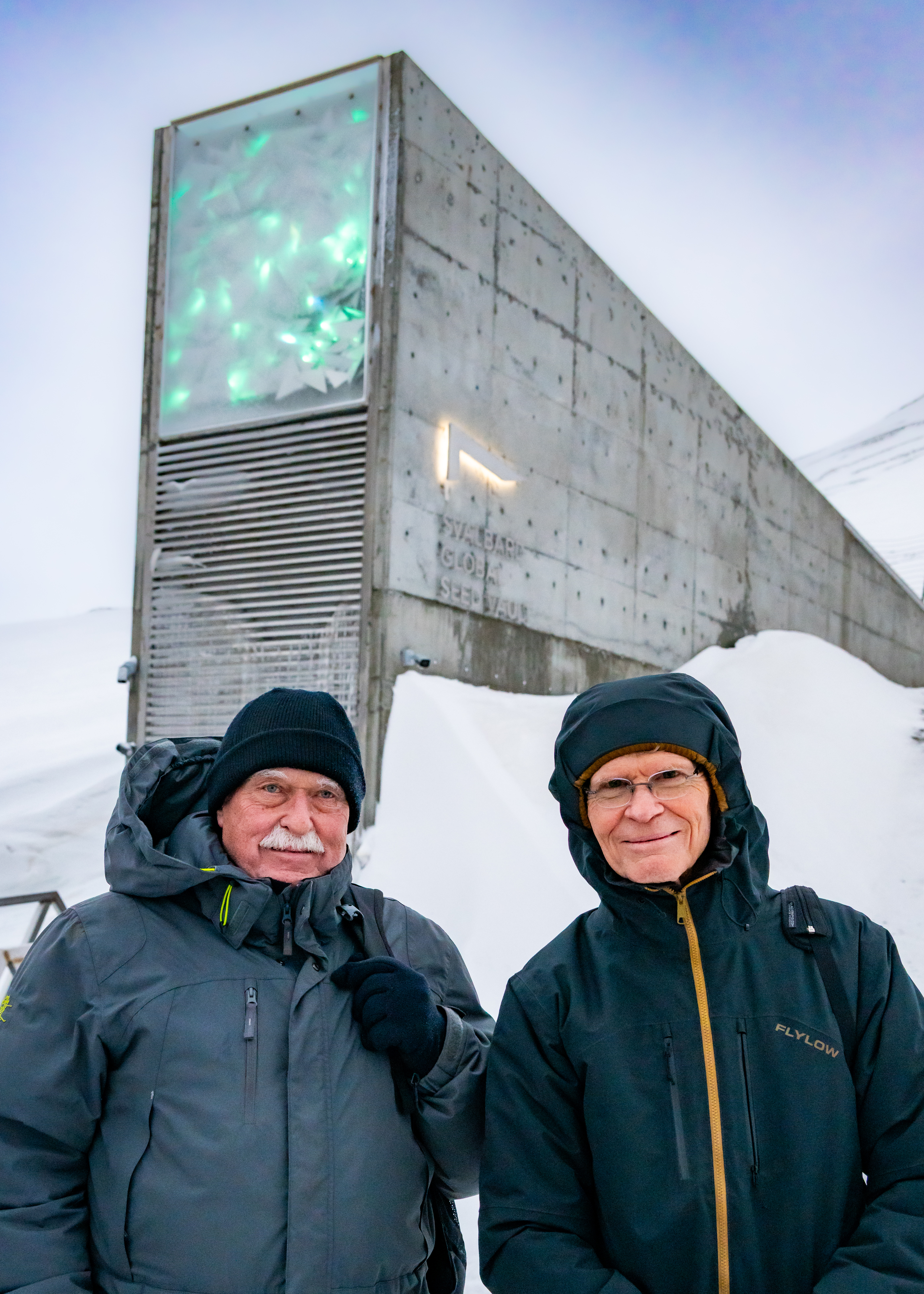
Geoffrey Hawtin and Cary Fowler served as the Crop Trust's first executive directors.

2004-2005 – Geoffrey Hawtin (Interim)

2005-2012 – Cary Fowler

2013-2019 – Marie Haga

2020–present – Stefan Schmitz

=== Executive Board Chair ===
2007–2012 – Margaret Catley-Carlson

2013–2017 – Walter Fust

2018–2019 – Amb. Timothy Fischer

2019–2021 – Sir Peter Crane

2022–present – Catherine Bertini

== Grants ==
Since its establishment, the Crop Trust has funded work in over 80 countries, and made its first grant for long-term conservation of a collection in late 2006. By 2011, the Crop Trust had established in-perpetuity support (i.e. grants funded through the Crop Trust's endowment) for collections of 15 crops: rice, cassava, wheat, barley, faba bean, pearl millet, maize, forages, banana, aroids, grass pea, sorghum, yam and lentil.

In 2007, the Crop Trust began a global initiative to rescue threatened, high-priority collections of crop diversity in developing countries and to support information systems to improve their conservation and availability. These efforts included providing support to developing countries and international agricultural research centers to deposit shipments of seed samples in the Svalbard Global Seed Vault for safety duplication purposes.

In 2010, the Crop Trust launched a global 10-year program to find, gather, catalog and save the wild relatives of 22 major food crops. These wild species contain untapped diversity to help address future challenges to agriculture.

== Svalbard Global Seed Vault ==
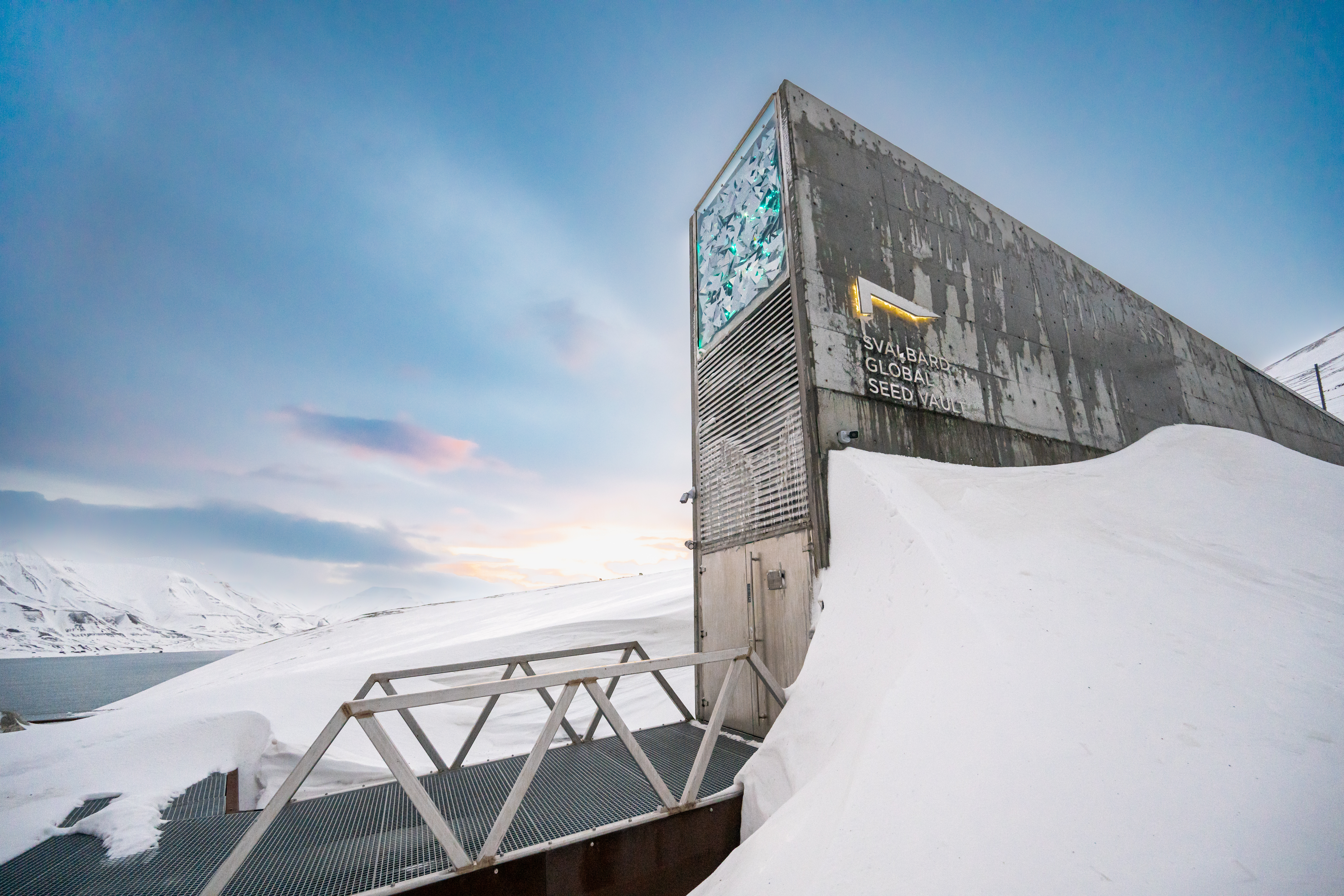
The Crop Trust provides most of the annual operating costs for the Svalbard Global Seed Vault

The Crop Trust joined the Government of Norway and the Nordic Gene Bank in the 2008 establishment of the Svalbard Global Seed Vault, a "fail-safe" facility located at Svalbard, Norway. The Seed Vault provides long-term storage of duplicates of seeds conserved in genebanks around the world. This provides security of the world's food supply against the loss of seeds in genebanks due to mismanagement, accident, equipment failures, funding cuts, and natural disasters. It is designed to hold the seeds of some 4.5 million samples of different varieties of agricultural crops. Primarily through the endowment fund, the Crop Trust provides most of the annual operating costs for the facility. With support from donors, the Crop Trust also assists selected genebanks in packaging and shipping seeds to the Seed Vault.
