= Crop diversity =

Variance of plants in agriculture

Crop diversity or crop biodiversity is the variety and variability of crops, plants used in agriculture, including their genetic and phenotypic characteristics. It is a specific element of agricultural biodiversity. Over the past 50 years, there has been a major decline in two components of crop diversity; genetic diversity within each crop and the number of species commonly grown.

Crop diversity loss threatens global food security, as the world's human population depends on a diminishing number of varieties of a diminishing number of crop species. Crops are increasingly grown in monoculture, meaning that if, as in the historic Great Famine of Ireland, a single disease overcomes a variety's resistance, it may destroy an entire harvest, or as in the case of the 'Gros Michel' banana, may cause the commercial extinction of an entire variety. With the help of seed banks, international organizations are working to preserve crop diversity.

== Biodiversity loss ==
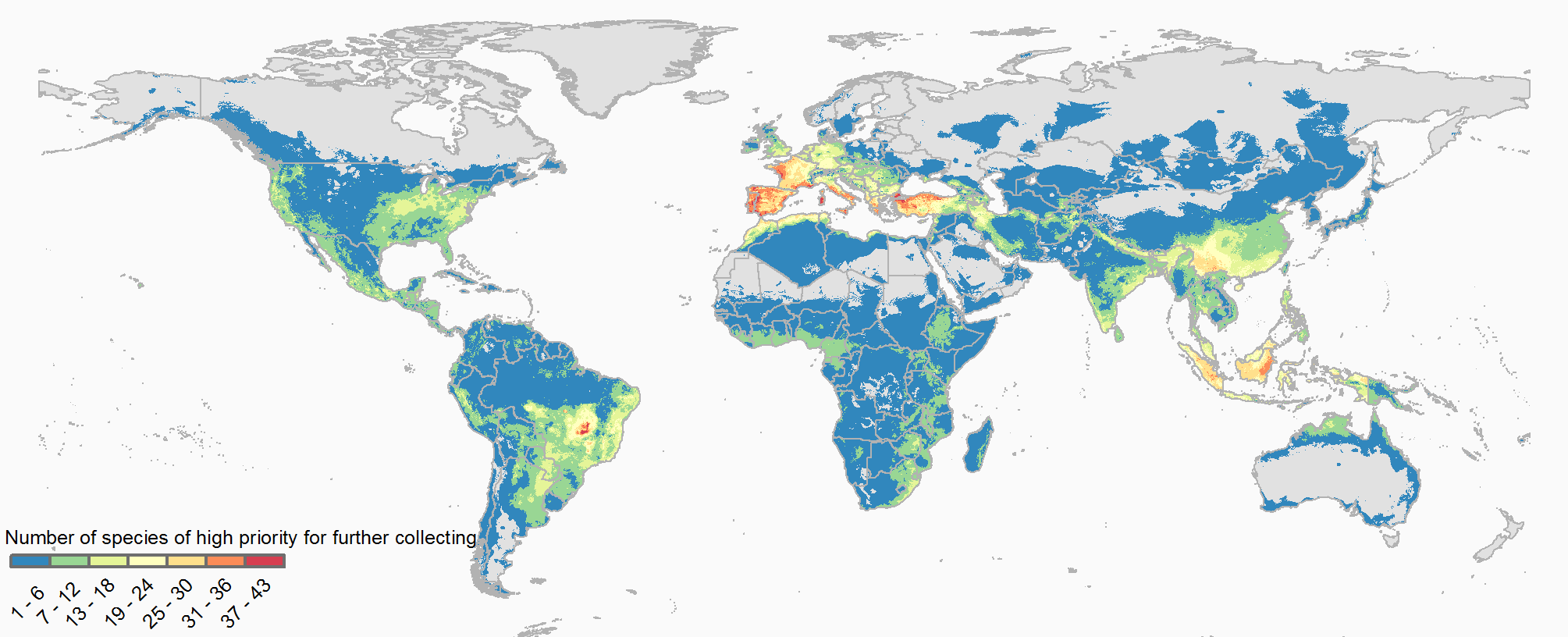
Geographic hotspots of distributions of crop wild relatives not represented in genebanks

The loss of biodiversity is considered one of today's most serious environmental concerns by the Food and Agriculture Organization. If current trends persist, as many as half of all plant species could face extinction. Some 6% of wild relatives of cereal crops such as wheat, maize, rice, and sorghum are under threat, as are 18% of legumes (Fabaceae), the wild relatives of beans, peas and lentils, and 13% of species within the botanical family (Solanaceae) that includes potato, tomato, eggplant (aubergine), and peppers (Capsicum).

== Within-crop diversity ==
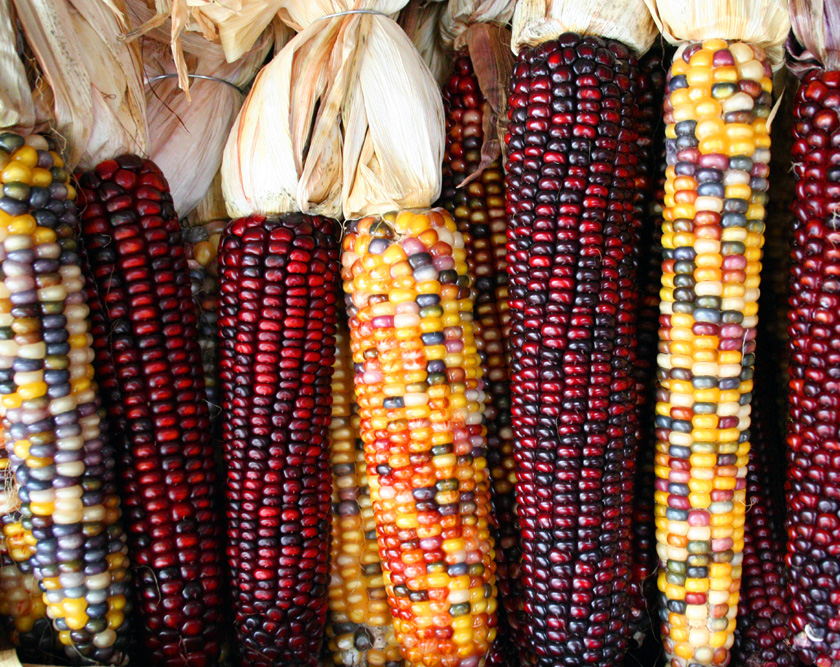
Within-crop diversity: maize cobs of differing colours

Within-crop diversity, a specific crop can result from various growing conditions, for example a crop growing in nutrient-poor soil is likely to have stunted growth than a crop growing in more fertile soil. The availability of water, soil pH level, and temperature similarly influence crop growth.

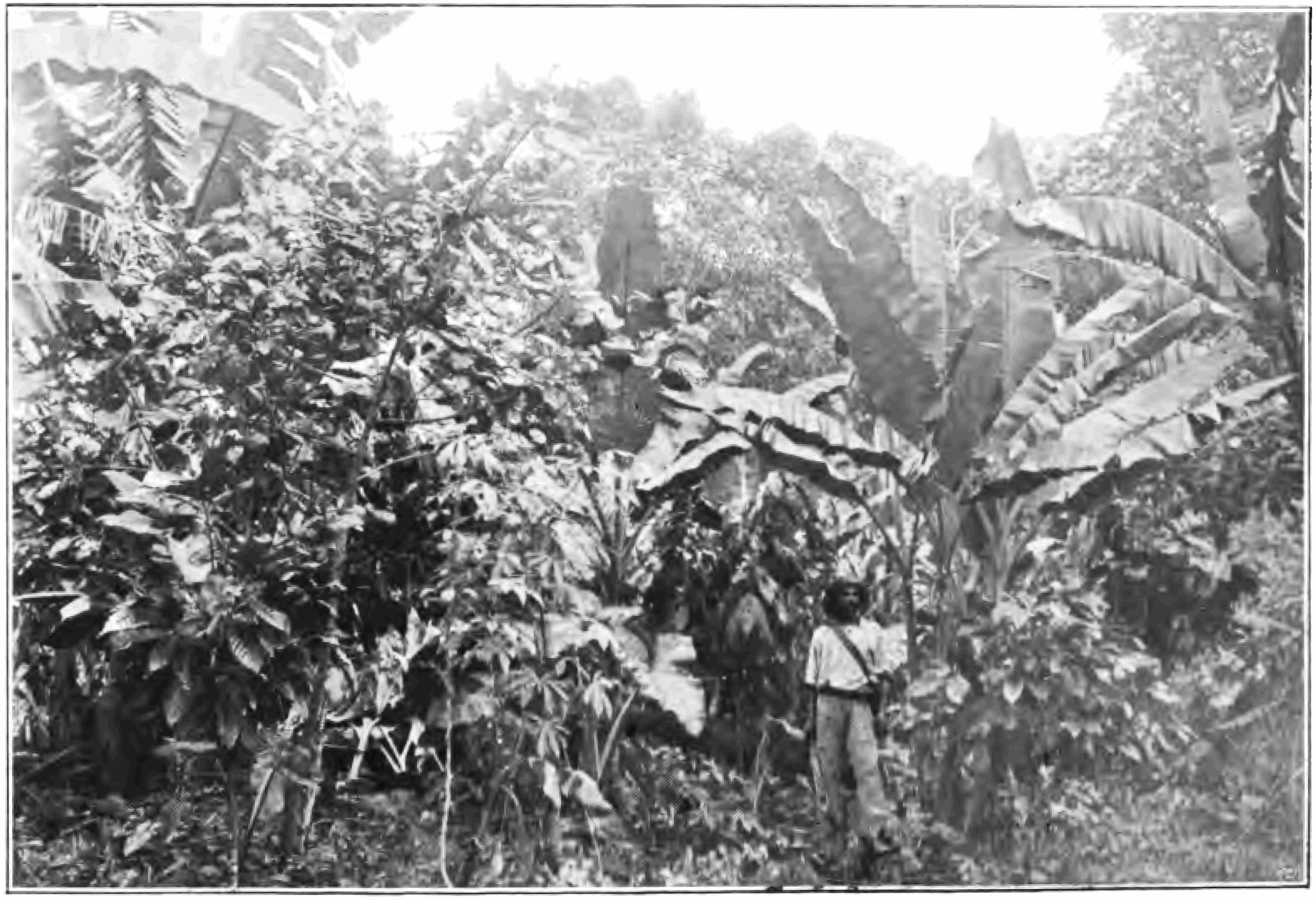
Traditional mixed crop (polyculture) cultivation of cacao and banana, Trinidad, 1903

In addition, diversity of a harvested plant can be the result of genetic differences: a crop may have genes conferring early maturity or disease resistance. Modern plant breeders develop new crop varieties to meet specific conditions. A new variety might, for example, be higher yielding, more disease resistant or have a longer shelf life than the varieties from which it was bred. The practical use of crop diversity goes back to early agricultural methods of crop rotation and fallow fields, where planting and harvesting one type of crop on a plot of land one year, and planting a different crop on that same plot the next year. This takes advantage of differences in a plant's nutrient needs, but more importantly reduces the buildup of pathogens.

Both farmers and scientists must continually draw on the irreplaceable resource of genetic diversity to ensure productive harvests. While genetic variability provides farmers with plants that have a higher resilience to pests and diseases and allows scientists access to a more diverse genome than can be found in highly selected crops. The breeding of high performing crops steadily reduces genetic diversity as desirable traits are selected, and undesirable traits are removed. Farmers can increase within-crop diversity to some extent by planting mixtures of crop varieties.

== Ecological effects ==
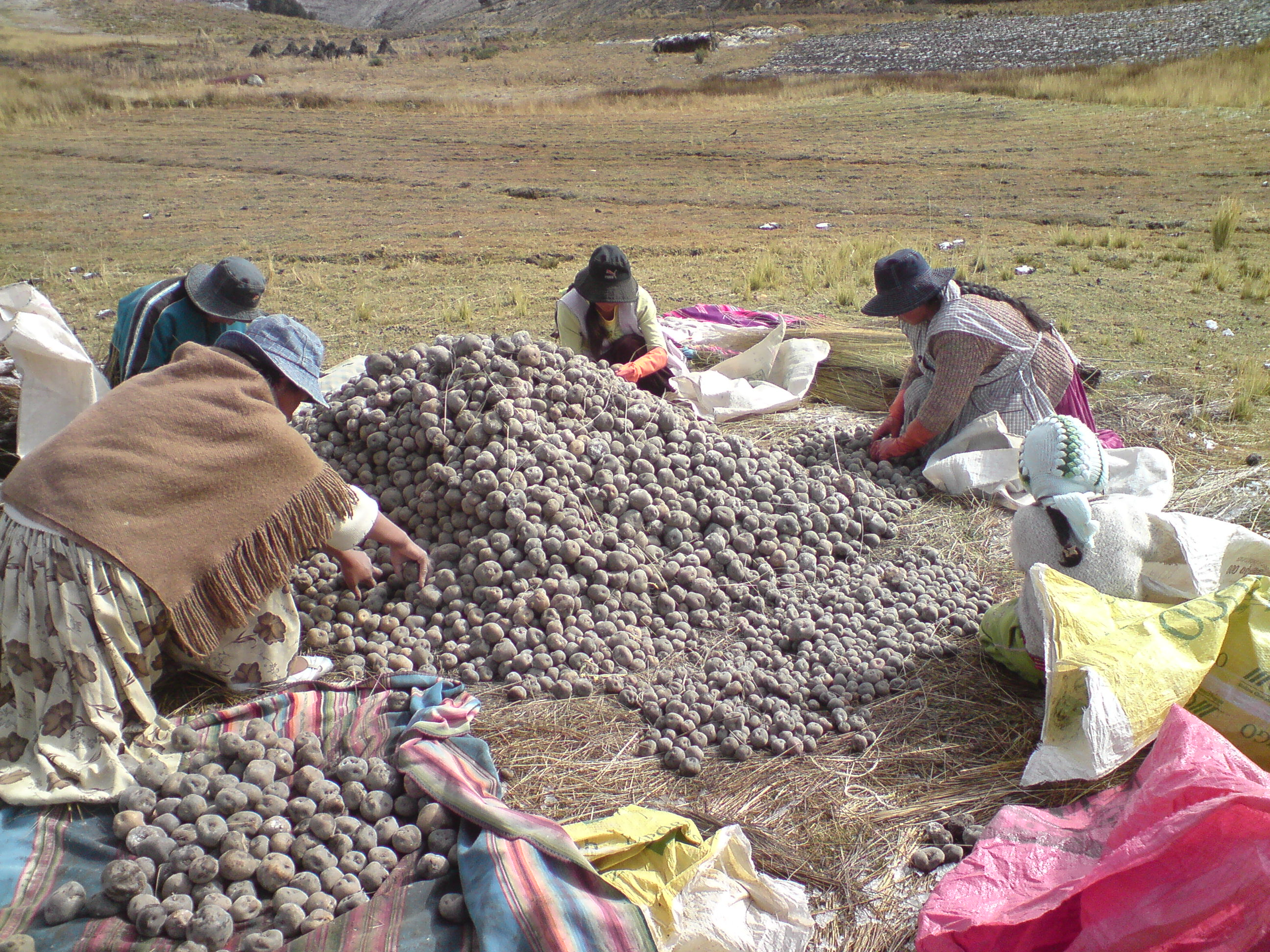
Biodiverse agroecosystem: traditional potato harvesting high in the Andes, Manco Kapac Province, Bolivia, 2012

Agricultural ecosystems function effectively as self-regulating systems provided they have sufficient biodiversity of plants and animals. Apart from producing food, fuel, and fibre, agroecosystem functions include recycling nutrients, maintaining soil fertility, regulating microclimate, regulating water flow, controlling pests, and detoxification of waste products.

However, modern agriculture seriously reduces biodiversity. Traditional systems maintain diversity within a crop species, such as in the Andes mountains where up to 50 varieties of potato are grown. Strategies to raise genetic diversity can involve planting mixtures of crop varieties.

Genetic diversity of crops can be used to help protect the environment. Crop varieties that are resistant to pests and diseases can reduce the need for application of harmful pesticides.

== Economic impact ==
Agriculture is the economic foundation of most countries, and for developing countries a likely source of economic growth. Growth in agriculture can benefit the rural poor, though it does not always do so. Profits from crops can increase from higher value crops, better marketing, value-adding activities such as processing, or expanded access for the public to markets. Profits can also decrease through reduced demand or increased production. Crop diversity can protect against crop failure, and can also offer higher returns.

Despite efforts to quantify them, the financial values of crop diversity sources remain entirely uncertain.

== Disease threats ==
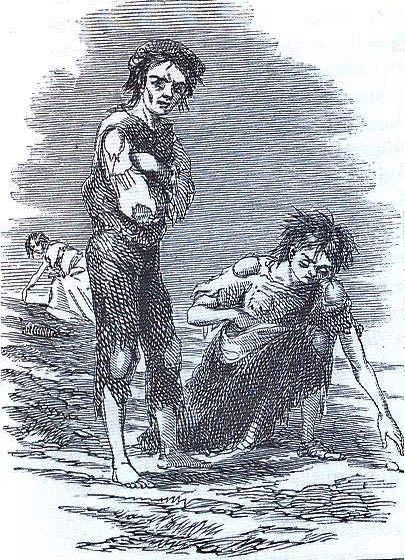
Loss of low-diversity crop to a single disease: the Great Famine, caused by the oomycete Phytophthora infestans. Starvation followed, as illustrated by James Mahony, 1847

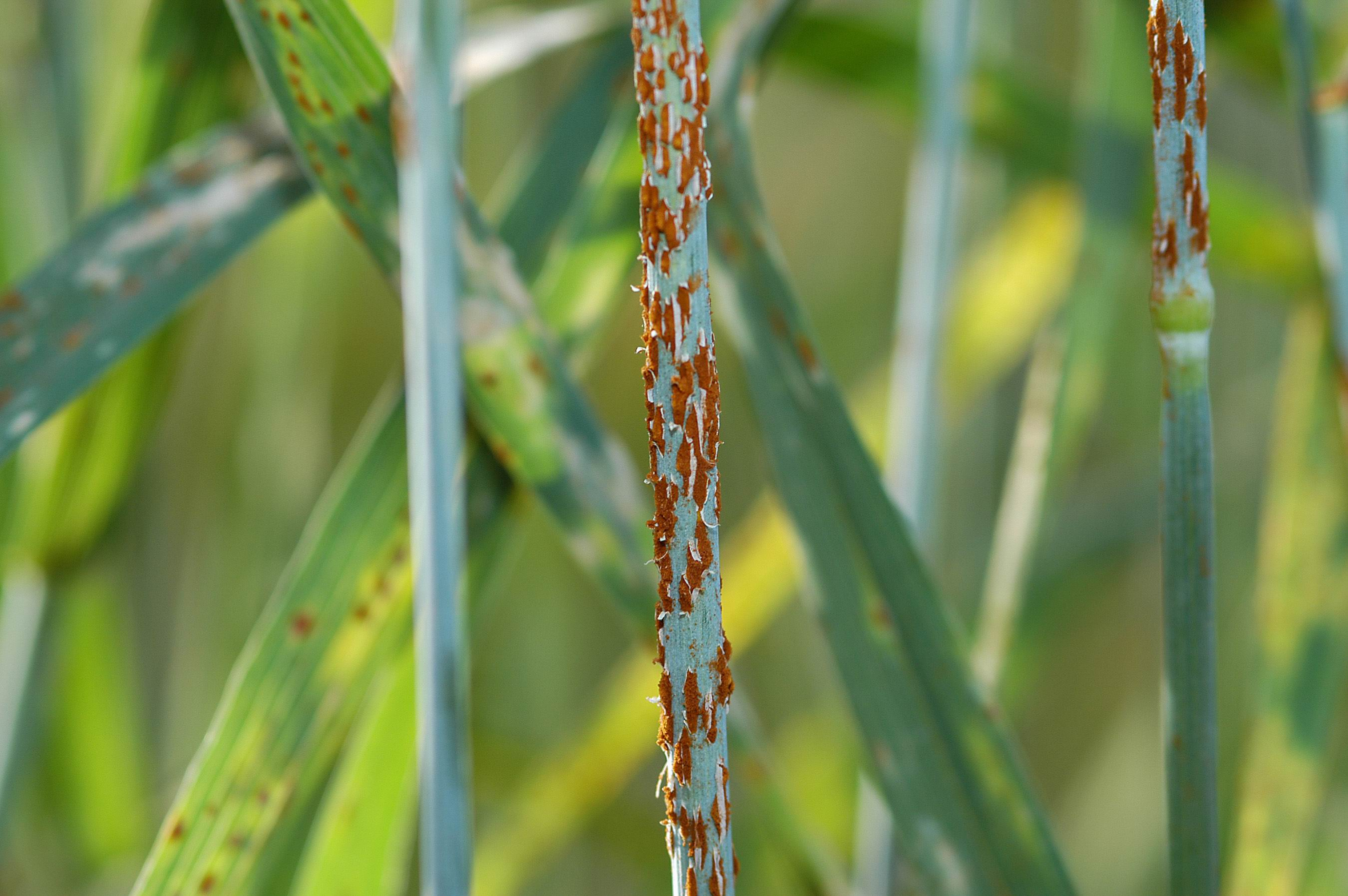
Wheat stem rust is evolving new, virulent strains, threatening many low-diversity cultivars.

Along with insect pests, disease is a major cause of crop loss. Wild species have a range of genetic variability that allows some individuals to survive should a disturbance occur. In agriculture, resistance through variability is compromised, since genetically uniform seeds are planted under uniform conditions. Monocultural agriculture thus causes low crop diversity, especially when the seeds are mass-produced or when plants (such as grafted fruit trees and banana plants) are cloned. A single pest or disease could threaten a whole crop due to this uniformity ("genetic erosion"). A well-known historic case was the Great Famine of Ireland of 1845–1847, where a vital crop with low diversity was destroyed by a single fungus. Another example is when a disease caused by a fungus affected the monocultured 1970 US corn crop, causing a loss of over one billion dollars in production.

A danger to agriculture is wheat rust, a pathogenic fungus causing reddish patches, coloured by its spores. A virulent form of the wheat disease, stem rust, strain Ug99, spread from Africa across to the Arabian Peninsula by 2007. In field trials in Kenya, more than 85% of wheat samples, including major cultivars, were susceptible, implying that higher crop diversity is required. The Nobel laureate Norman Borlaug argued for action to ensure global food security.

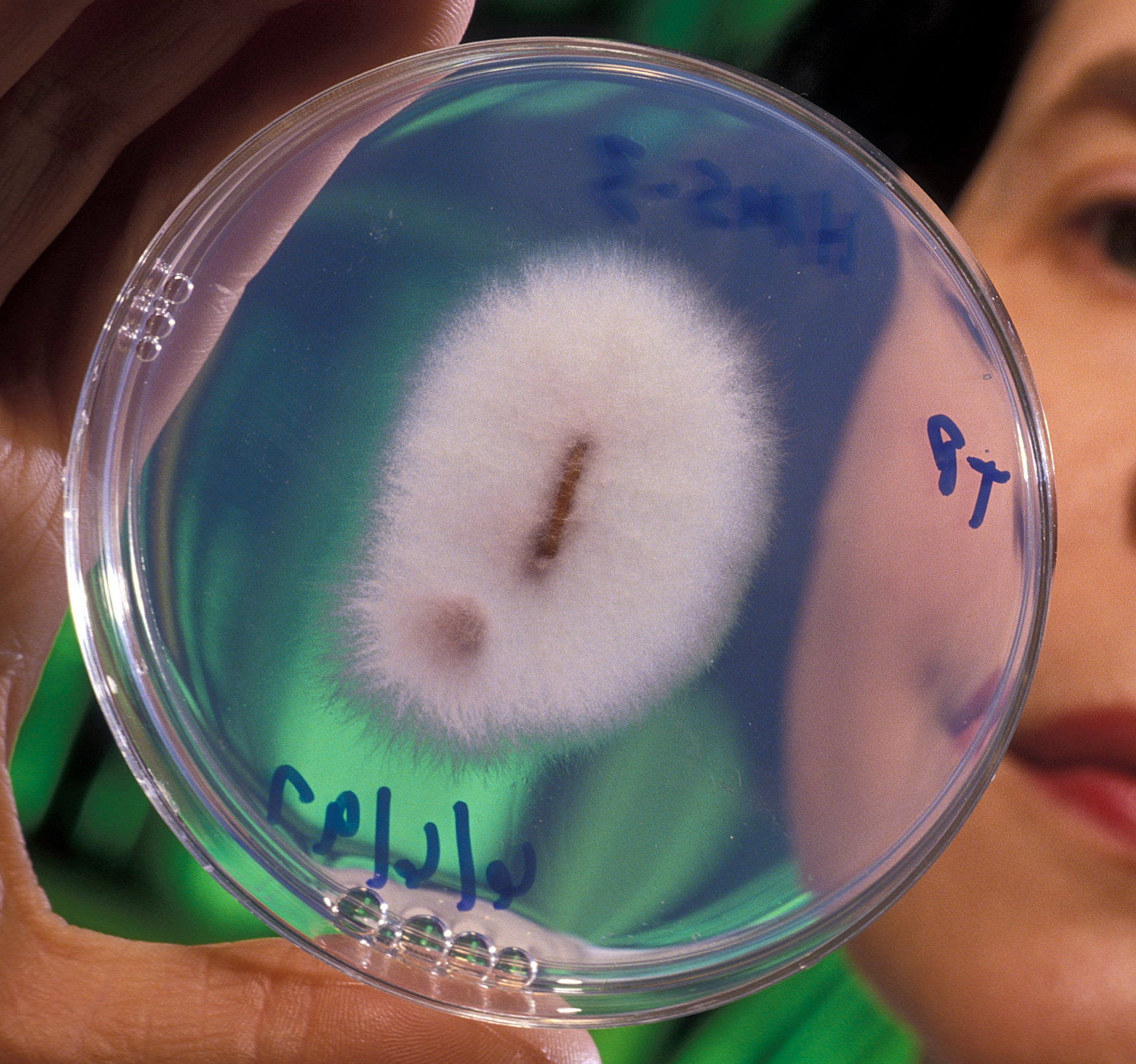
Low-diversity crop variety destroyed: the 'Gros Michel' banana was commercially destroyed by Panama disease, caused by the fungus Fusarium oxysporum (illustrated).

Reports from Burundi and Angola warn of a threat to food security caused by the African Cassava Mosaic Virus (ACMD). ACMD is responsible for the loss of a million tons of cassava each year. CMD is prevalent in all the main cassava-growing areas in the Great Lakes region of east Africa, causing between 20 and 90 percent crop losses in the Congo. The FAO emergency relief and rehabilitation program is assisting vulnerable returnee populations in the African Great Lakes Region through mass propagation and distribution of CMD resistant or highly tolerant cassava.

A well known occurrence of disease susceptibility in crops lacking diversity concerns the 'Gros Michel', a seedless banana that saw world marketing in the 1940s. As the market demand became high for this particular cultivar, growers and farmers began to use the Gros Michel banana almost exclusively. Genetically, these bananas are clones, and because of this lack of genetic diversity, are all susceptible to a single fungus, Fusarium oxysporum (Panama disease); large areas of the crop were destroyed by the fungus in the 1950s. 'Gros Michel' has been replaced by the current main banana on the market, the 'Cavendish', which in turn is (2015) at risk of total loss to a strain of the same fungus, 'Tropical Race 4'.

Such threats can be countered by strategies such as planting multi-line cultivars and cultivar mixes, in the hope that some of the cultivars will be resistant to any individual outbreak of disease.

== Organizations and technologies ==
The implications of crop diversity are at both local and world levels. Global organizations that aim to support diversity include Bioversity International (formerly known as International Plant Genetic Resources Institute), the International Institute of Tropical Agriculture, the Borlaug Global Rust Initiative, and the International Network for Improvement of Banana and Plantain. Members of the United Nations, at the World Summit on Sustainable Development 2002 at Johannesburg, said that crop diversity is in danger of being lost if measures are not taken.

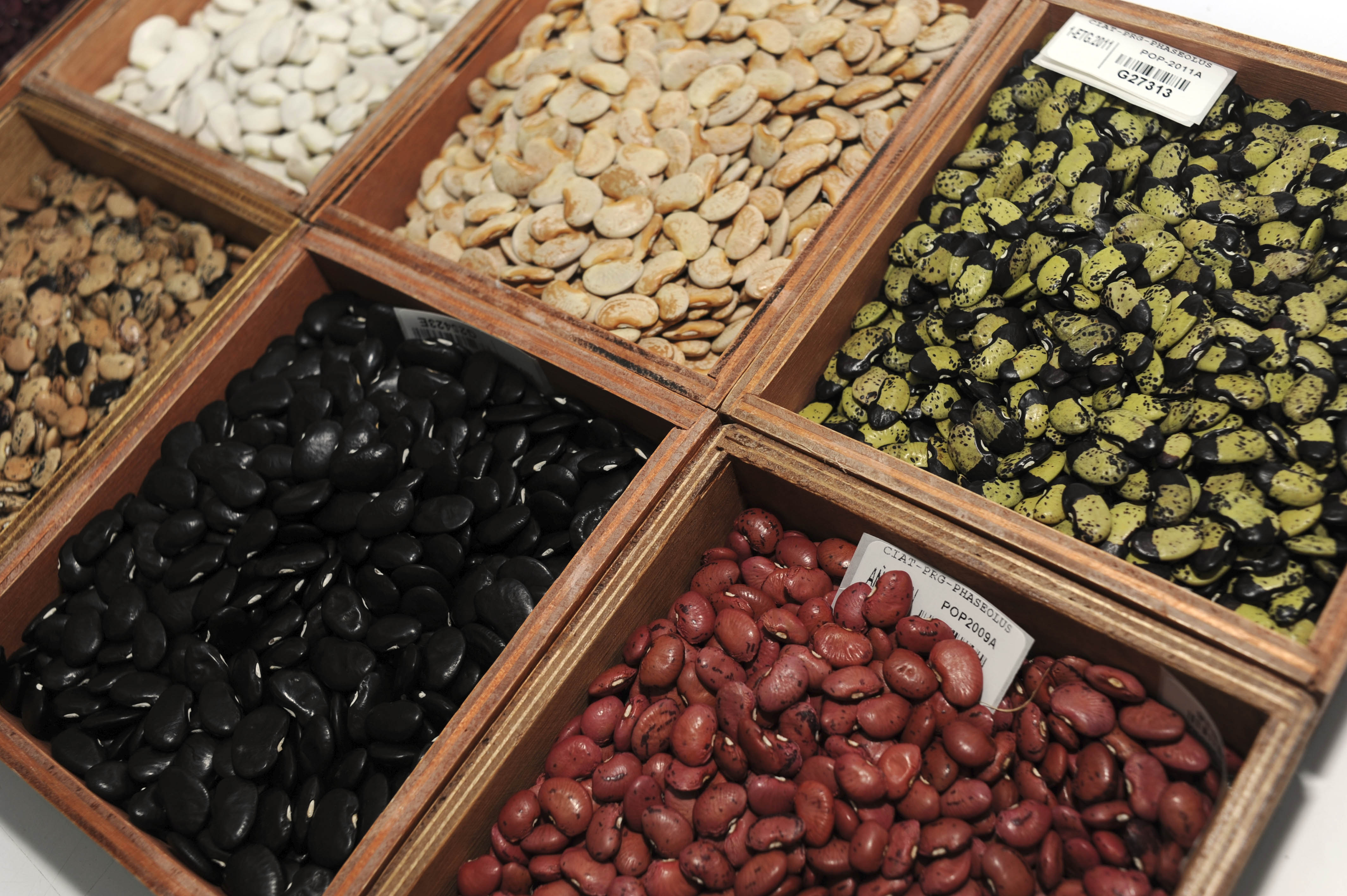
Six bean varieties at a gene bank

The Global Crop Diversity Trust is an independent international organisation which exists to ensure the conservation and availability of crop diversity for food security worldwide. It was established through a partnership between the United Nations Food and Agriculture Organization (FAO) and CGIAR acting through Bioversity International. The CGIAR is a consortium of international agriculture research centers (IARC) and others that each conduct research on and preserve germplasm from a particular crop or animal species. The genebanks of CGIAR centers hold some of the world's largest off site collections of plant genetic resources in trust for the world community. Collectively, the CGIAR genebanks contain more than 778,000 accessions of more than 3,000 crop, forage, and agroforestry species. The collection includes farmers' varieties and improved varieties and, in substantial measure, the wild species from which those varieties were created. National germplasm storage centers include the U.S. Department of Agriculture's National Center for Genetic Resources Preservation, India's National Bureau of Animal Genetic Resources, the Taiwan Livestock Research Institute, and the proposed Australian Network of Plant Genetic Resource Centers.

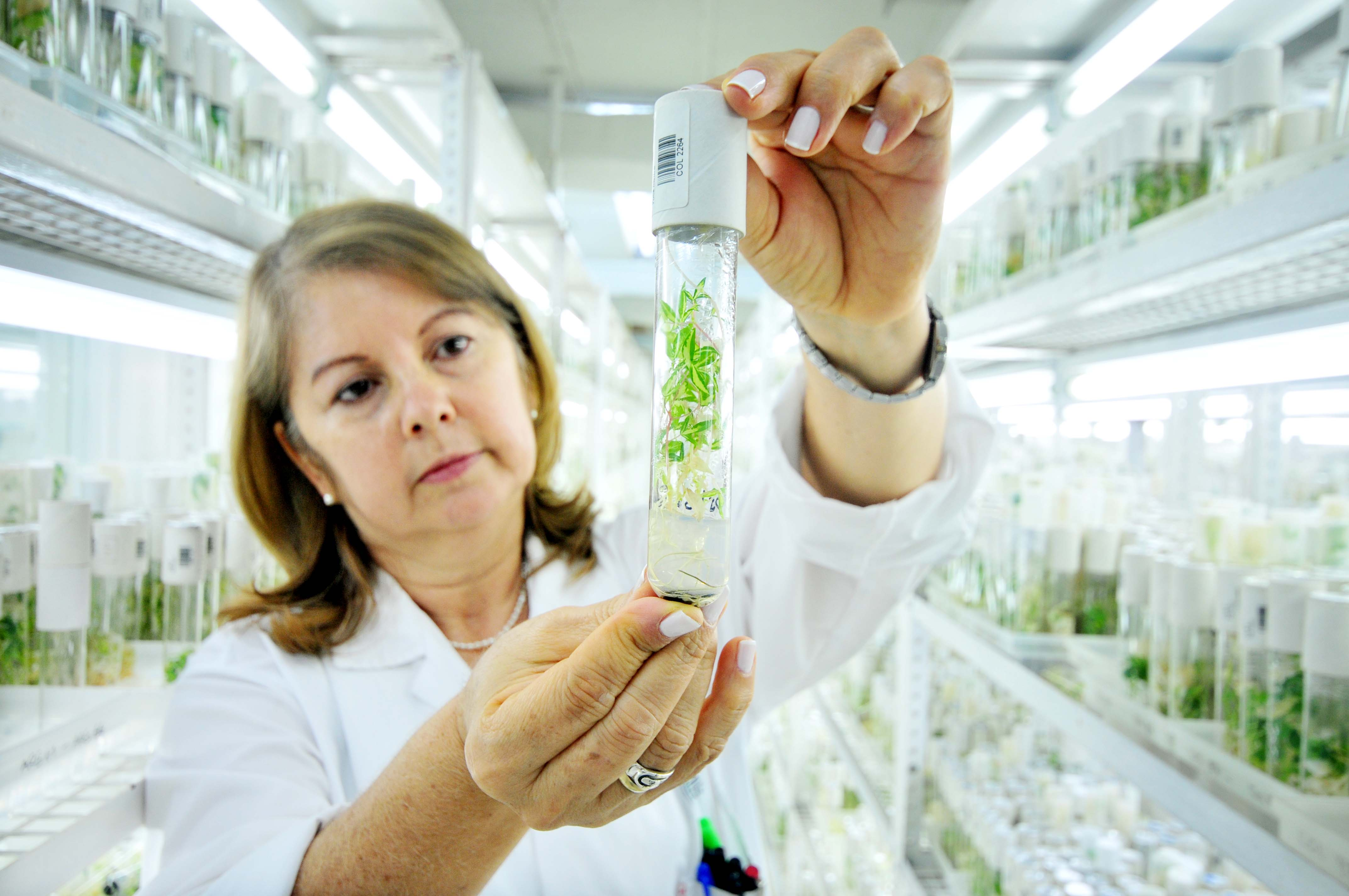
Plants in the International Center for Tropical Agriculture's gene bank, Colombia

The World Resources Institute (WRI) and the World Conservation Union (IUCN) are non-profit organizations that provide funding and other support to off site and on site conservation efforts. The wise use of crop genetic diversity in plant breeding and genetic modification can also contribute significantly to protecting the biodiversity in crops. Crop varieties can be genetically modified to resist specific pests and diseases. For example, a gene from the soil bacterium Bacillus thuringiensis (Bt) produces a natural insecticide toxin. Genes from Bt can be inserted into crop plants to make them capable of producing an insecticidal toxin and therefore a resistance to certain pests. Bt corn (maize) can however adversely affect non-target insects closely related to the target pest, as with the monarch butterfly.

== See also ==
- Conservation (ethic)
- Corporate farming
- Famine food
- Horizontal resistance provides flexibility in resistance to pathogens
- Landraces
- List of environmental issues
- Plant genetic resources
- Small-scale agriculture
- Vavilov center
