= Cary Fowler =

American agriculturalist (b.1949)

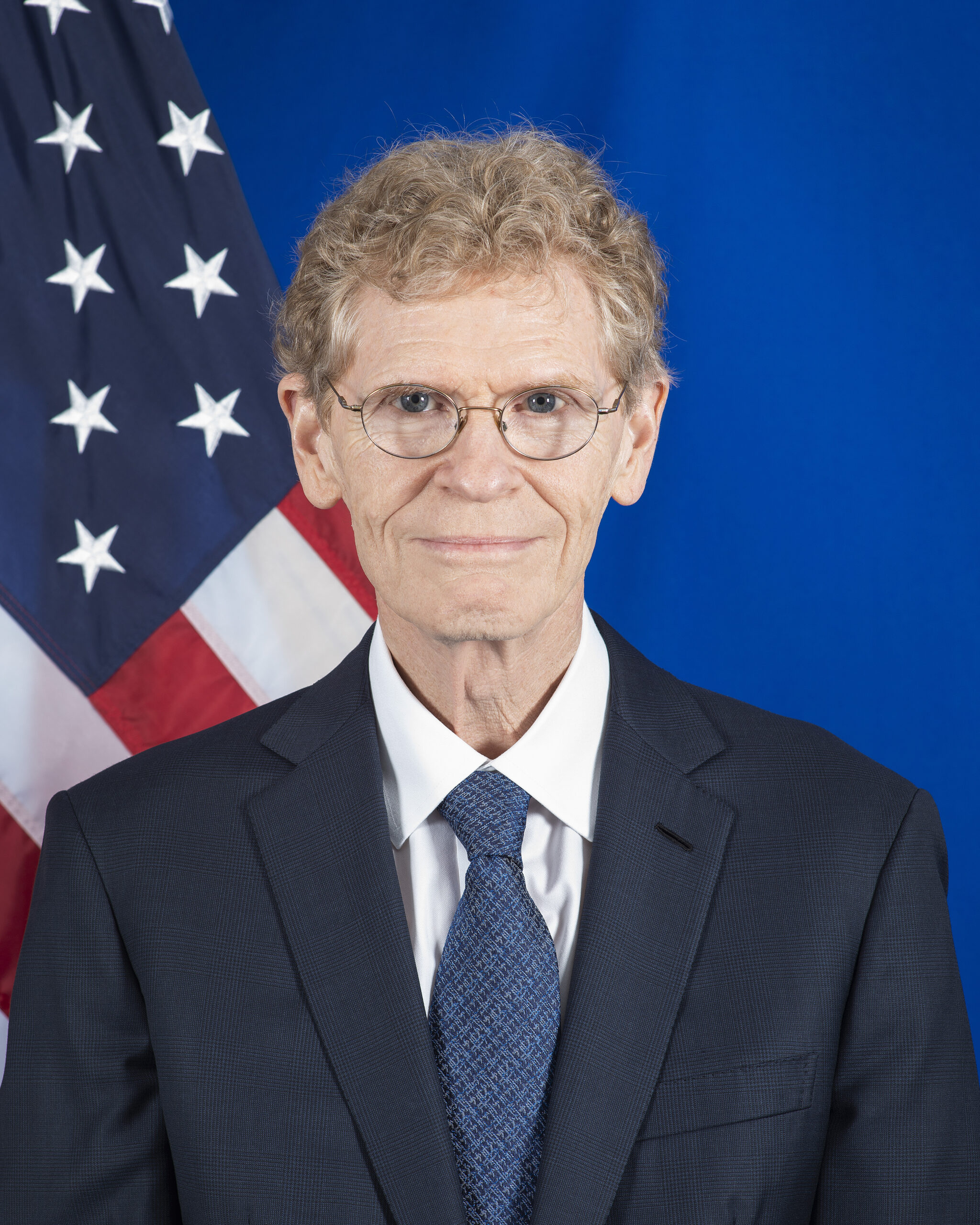
- Official portrait, 2022

United States Special Envoy for Global Food Security
- In office May 5, 2022 – January 20, 2025
- President: Joe Biden
- Preceded by: Vacant
- Succeeded by: Vacant

Personal details
- Born: Morgan Carrington Fowler Jr. 1949 (age 76–77) Memphis, Tennessee, U.S.
- Spouse: Amy Goldman Fowler (m. 2012)
- Education: Rhodes College, Simon Fraser University, Uppsala University
- Known for: Svalbard Global Seed Vault, Crop Trust
- Awards: Right Livelihood Award, Heinz Award, Vavilov Medal, World Food Prize
- Website: www.caryfowler.com

Morgan Carrington "Cary" Fowler Jr. (born 1949) is an American agriculturalist who served as the U.S. Special Envoy for Global Food Security from 2022 to 2025. He was previously executive director of the Crop Trust. Fowler received the 2024 World Food Prize.

== Early life ==
Fowler was born in 1949 to Morgan, a General Sessions judge, and Betty, a dietician. He graduated from White Station High School in Memphis, Tennessee, in 1967, and attended Rhodes College in Memphis, but transferred in his junior year to Simon Fraser University in Canada, earning his B.A. Honors degree in 1971. He received a Ph.D. degree in Sociology from Uppsala University in Sweden.

Fowler was active in civil rights demonstrations in Memphis. He was present at the Mason Temple on April 3, 1968, when Martin Luther King Jr. made his last speech, "I've Been to the Mountaintop". During the Vietnam War, he obtained conscientious objector status and worked at a hospital in North Carolina.

== Career ==
In the 1970s-80s Fowler was Program Director for the National Sharecroppers Fund/Rural Advancement Fund. Following this, he served as Professor and Director of Research in the Department for International Environment & Development Studies at the Norwegian University of Life Sciences in Ås, Norway. He also led the International Conference and Programme on Plant Genetic Resources at the Food and Agriculture Organization of the United Nations (UN) in the 1990s. There, he produced the UN's first global assessment of the state of the world's crop diversity and was the chief author of the Food and Agriculture Organization's Global Plan of Action for Plant Genetic Resources. He subsequently supervised the negotiations that led to its adoption by 150 countries in 1996.

From 1996 to 2001, Fowler represented the Consultative Group on International Agricultural Research (CGIAR) in negotiations for the International Treaty on Plant Genetic Resources.

In 2010, he played a lead role in saving one of the world's largest living collections of fruit and berry varieties at the Pavlovsk Experimental Station in Russia. In order to save the Station, he led an international campaign of scientists and citizens who voiced their concerns about the threatened conversion of this station to a housing development.

In 2013, Fowler was elected to Membership in the Russian Academy of Sciences, which carries the title of Academician. He is one of two foreign members of the Academy.

Fowler has also previously served as a Special Assistant to the Secretary General of the World Food Summit, as a board member of the International Maize and Wheat Improvement Center (CIMMYT) in Mexico, as the chair of the board of The Livestock Conservancy, as a member of the Seed Savers Exchange board, and as a member of the National Plant Genetic Resources Board of the U.S. Fowler is also a member of the New York Botanical Garden Corporation.

On June 1, 2015, United States President Barack Obama appointed Fowler as a Member of the Board for International Food and Agricultural Development.

In April 2017, Fowler was elected Chair of the Board of Trustees of Rhodes College.

After being appointed U.S. Special Envoy for Global Food Security by President Joe Biden, Fowler joined the U.S. Department of State on May 5, 2022. In May 2023, he was one of 500 US citizens sanctioned by Russia.

== Global Crop Diversity Trust ==
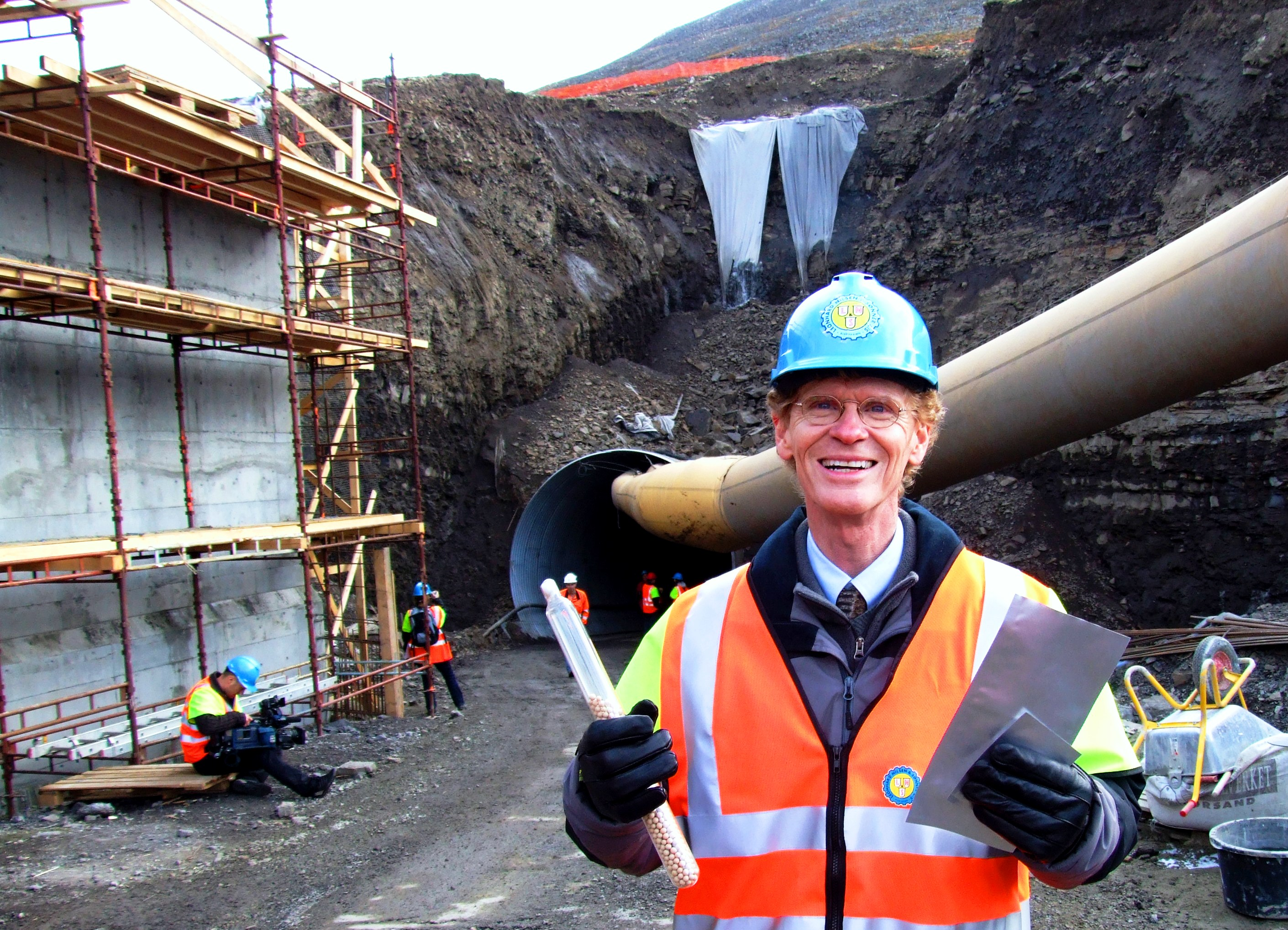
Cary Fowler in front of the Seed Vault being built on Spitsbergen, showing the kind of containers used for the seeds.

Fowler served as the Executive Director of the Global Crop Diversity Trust from 2005 to 2012. The trust's mandate is to ensure "the conservation and availability of crop diversity for food security worldwide." Fowler is known as the father of the Svalbard Global Seed Vault, which currently houses samples of more than one million distinct crop varieties. Former UN Secretary-General Ban Ki-moon described the vault as an “inspirational symbol of peace and food security for the entire humanity.”

Working with partner genebanks in 71 countries during Fowler's tenure as executive director, the Trust helped rescue 83,393 unique crop varieties from extinction.

It sponsored more than 40 projects to screen crop collections for important traits such as heat and drought tolerance. In partnership with the USDA, a state-of-the-art genebank management system ("GRIN-Global") was developed and made available to 38 genebanks internationally, and the first ever global portal to accession (sample) level information (Genesys) was launched. The Trust's endowment grew more than $100 million to $134 million, and total funds raised surpassed $200 million.

By the end of Fowler's tenure, the Trust concluded three major agreements intended to protect and conserve crop diversity: with the Millennium Seed Bank of Kew Gardens, the indigenous communities in the Andes, and the international genebanks of the Consultive Group on International Agricultural Research (CGIAR).

He stepped down as Executive Director of the Crop Trust in late 2012.

== Awards and honors ==
Fowler has received several honorary degrees, including an Honorary Doctorate of Law degree from Simon Fraser University, an Honorary Doctorate of Science degree from Rhodes College, an Honorary Doctorate of Humanities degree from Oberlin College, and an Honorary Doctorate from the Norwegian University of Life Sciences. He received the Right Livelihood Award with Pat Mooney in 1985 for his work in agriculture and the preservation of biodiversity. Fowler has also received the Vavilov Medal from the Russian Academy of Agricultural Sciences. In 2010, he was one of ten recipients of the 16th Annual Heinz Awards with a special focus on global change. In 2012, he was awarded the "Wind Beneath my Wings" award jointly with his wife Amy P. Goldman at Bette Midler's annual "Hulaween" party. He was the baccalaureate speaker at the 2013 Rhodes College commencement ceremonies and received the 2015 William L. Brown Award for Excellence in Genetic Resource Conservation from the Missouri Botanical Garden.

In 2016 Fowler received the Frank N. Meyer Medal for Plant Genetic Resources, given by the Crop Science Society of America. He and his wife Amy Goldman Fowler jointly received the "Visionary" Award from the American Visionary Art Museum.

Fowler's book Seeds on Ice: Svalbard and the Global Seed Vault was awarded the 2016 Nautilus Book Award Gold Medal for best book in the Ecology/Environment category.

Fowler received the 2018 Thomas Jefferson Medal in Citizen Leadership, awarded jointly by the University of Virginia and the Thomas Jefferson Foundation, and gave the keynote address at Monticello on the occasion of Jefferson's 275th birthday.

At a May 9, 2024 ceremony at the U.S. Department of State, the World Food Prize Foundation announced that Fowler had been selected as a 2024 World Food Prize Laureate, alongside Dr. Geoffrey Hawtin, for their work on seed genetics and the Svalbard Global Seed Vault.

== Media ==
Fowler has made many media appearances, including the CBS news show 60 Minutes. He has been profiled in The New Yorker magazine, presented at the Pop!Tech conference and spoken at the TED Global Conference in Oxford.

Fowler was the focus of the award-winning 2013 documentary Seeds of Time. The film centers on Fowler's work to protect the world's food supply with the Svalbard Global Seed Vault and the challenges facing seed protection and genetic diversity efforts as a result of climate change. He was also featured in the 2013 documentary Seed Battles.

== Personal life ==
In 2012, Fowler married author, gardener, and seed saving advocate Amy Goldman. He has two children and is a melanoma and testicular cancer survivor.

== Bibliography ==
In addition to authoring more than 100 articles in various agriculture, law development and biology journals, Fowler has authored and coauthored several books.

- Lappé, Frances M.; Collins, Joseph; Fowler, Cary (1979) [1978]. Food First: Beyond the Myth of Scarcity. New York: Ballantine. ISBN 978-0-345-29818-8.
- Fowler, Cary; Mooney, Pat R. (1990). Shattering: Food, Politics and the Loss of Genetic Diversity. Tucson: University of Arizona Press. ISBN 978-0-8165-1181-5.
- Berg, Trygve; Bjoernstad, Åsmund; Fowler, Cary; Skroppa, Tore (1991). Technology Options and the Gene Struggle. NorAgric Occasional Papers, Series C: Development and Environment. Vol. 8. Ås: NorAgric. OCLC 64068043.
- Fowler, Cary (1994). Unnatural Selection: Technology, Politics and Plant Evolution. International Studies in Global Change. Vol. 6. Switzerland: Gordon and Breach. ISBN 978-2-88124-640-1.
- Fowler, Cary (2016). Seeds on Ice: Svalbard and the Global Seed Vault. Westport, CT: Prospecta. ISBN 978-1-63226-057-4.
