= International Tropical Fruits Network =

- Abbreviation: TFNet
- Formation: 1 August 2000
- Type: International network
- Headquarters: Serdang, Malaysia
- Region served: Tropical and subtropical countries
- Members: Government agencies, organizations, private companies, individual experts
- TFNet Chairman: Datuk Seri Isham Bin Ishak, Secretary General of the Ministry of Agriculture and Food Security of Malaysia
- Chief Executive Officer: Muhamed Salim bin Mohd Ali
- Website: www.itfnet.org

The International Tropical Fruits Network (TFNet) is an independent and self-financing global network established under the auspices of the Food and Agriculture Organization of the United Nations (FAO). It is now an intergovernmental and inter-institutional international organization, with the mandate and role to promote sustainable global development of the tropical fruit in relation to production, consumption and trade. It is membership-based, with members acting through one lead agency on inter-country decisions.

Currently, TFNet has hundreds of members from 38 countries, 14 of them are governments of the following countries: Australia, Bangladesh, China, Fiji, India, Indonesia, Malaysia, Nigeria, Philippines, Saudi Arabia, Sri Lanka, Sudan, Syria, and Vietnam. It also has 20 associate members composed of companies and organizations including CAB International, Bioversity International, Crops for the Future, Afro-Asian Rural Development Organization, Inter-American Institute for Cooperation on Agriculture (IICA), and ordinary members.

== Background ==
During the 1st International Consultation on Tropical Fruits held in Malaysia on 15–19 July 1996, delegates from 22 countries conferred about economic and trade issues that centered on the current situation of the tropical fruit industry, future prospects for fresh and processed tropical fruits, tariff concerns, and phytosanitary and quarantine measures. They also recognized the importance of tropical fruits in providing vitamins, nutrients, micronutrients, and fiber essential for human health and well-being. One of the solutions proposed to address these needs is through the creation of a tropical fruits network.

The Sub-Group on Tropical Fruits (SGTF) was established during the 15th session of the Intergovernmental Group on Banana in Rome in May 1997. During the 1st session of SGTF in Pattaya, Thailand in May 1998, it was agreed that TFNet should be a global independent network, with possibility of regional networks. Malaysia and Thailand were vying to house the TFNet headquarters. In May 1999, the Committee on Commodity Problems decided to set up the headquarters in Malaysia.

== Programmes and activities ==
=== Projects and consultancies ===
TFNet has completed projects and consultancies in partnership with international organizations. With FAO, TFNet prepared action plans for the sustainable development of the tropical fruit industry in Bangladesh, Fiji, Malaysia, and the Philippines. A plant variety protection study for tropical fruits in 8 Asian countries was also conducted with GTZ (now GIZ). TFNet was also tapped during the 1st phase of a project with the International Plant Genetic Resources Institute (IPGRI) (now Bioversity International) and The Asian Development Bank on the sustainable conservation and utilization of tropical fruit genetic resources in Asia.

Local projects have also been conducted with the Malaysian government that focused on pineapple, watermelon, and other crops.

=== International seminars and conferences ===
International seminars on tropical and subtropical fruits have also organized by TFNet on trade, postharvest handling and processing, economics and marketing, consumer trends and export, and recent developments in the production, postharvest management and trade of minor tropical fruits. These seminars have been conducted in several countries in Asia and Africa.

=== Workshops and study tours ===
Five hands-on workshops and study visits were conducted with Sentra Pengembangan Agribisnis Terpadu (SPAT Indonesia) on food processing techniques such as fruit chip production. A three-year technical assistance on post-harvest handling and processing of fruits in the Syrian Arab Republic was also conducted with funding from the Malaysian government. Workshops and study tours have also been conducted in Malaysia, Indonesia, Thailand, Fiji, Nigeria, and other South East Asian countries.

=== Information dissemination ===
TFNet also facilitates the exchange of expert information among its members through a website and information portal that includes a fruit compendium, experts list, trade database, and discussion forums. A monthly news feed on global tropical fruit news is sent to members and subscribers. TFNet also collaborated with other organizations to establish MyFruit.org and a Global Information System on African tropical fruits.

== Membership ==
=== Country members ===
Country membership is open to all member countries of the FAO that are signatories to the Agreement on the Establishment of TFNet or who has acceded to the said Agreement.

Current country members are:

- Malaysia
- The Republic of Fiji
- The People's Republic of China
- The Syrian Arab Republic
- Federal Republic of Nigeria
- Republic of Indonesia
- People's Republic of Bangladesh
- Republic of the Philippines
- Republic of India
- Republic of Sudan
- The Socialist Republic of Vietnam
- The Commonwealth of Australia
- Republic of Sri Lanka
- Kingdom of Saudi Arabia

=== Associate members ===
Associate membership is open to any international, regional or national organizations, institutes, associations, cooperatives, or business entity in both the public and private sectors.

Some notable associate members include:

- CAB International
- Bioversity International
- Southern Fruits Research Institute (SOFRI)
- Sentra Pengembangan Agribisnis Terpadu (SPAT)
- Sime Darby Plantation Bhd.
- BAS Speciality Fertilizers Sdn. Bhd
- Malaysian Agrifood Corporation (MAFC
- S A Mango Growers' Association @ S A Subtropical Grower' Associations (SUBTROP
- Global Food Traceability Forum (GFTF)
- Inter-American Institute for Cooperation on Agriculture (IICA)
- International Mango Organization (IMO)
- Afro-Asian Rural Development Organization (AARDO)
- International Centre of Insect Physiology and Ecology (ICIPE)

=== Ordinary members ===
Ordinary membership is open to any individual or non-profit organizations that can contribute positively to the objectives and operations of TFNet.

== Official website ==
Official Website
