= MusaNet =

French-based international research network

- Established: 2011
- Location: Montpellier, France
- Members: Global
- Parent organization: Coordinated by Bioversity International
- Website: musanet.org

MusaNet is a global network of scientists and other stakeholders working on banana (Musa spp.) genetic resources. Founded in 2011 and coordinated by Bioversity International, it has over 100 individual members representing various banana research institutes and organizations.

== Vision and mission ==
MusaNet aims to optimize the conservation and use of Musa genetic resources by coordinating and strengthening the conservation and related research efforts of a worldwide network of public and private sector stakeholders.

The vision of MusaNet is "a world in which Musa genetic diversity is valued, secured and supporting all life."

The mission of MusaNet is "To build upon existing strengths in the global, regional and national collections by bringing people to optimize the effort to conserve, add value and promote the use and safe distribution of a wide range of Musa genetic diversity as a foundation for further breeding or direct use by farmers."

MusaNet is committed to overseeing the further development and monitoring of the implementation of The Global Strategy for the Conservation and Use of Musa Genetic Resources (MusaNet 2016) by meeting the following objectives:

- Ensure the secured conservation of the entire Musa genepool by assessing the diversity conserved and filling gaps in collections, with an emphasis on threatened material.
- Strengthen the capacity of partners for the cost-effective long-term conservation and management of germplasm collections and facilitate access to useful Musa genetic resources in improvement programmes and by other users.
- Enhance the value of Musa genetic resources for breeding, through effective collaborative characterization, evaluation and pre-breeding efforts.
- Raise awareness with key partners on the importance of Musa genetic resources conservation, documentation, exchange and sharing the benefits arising from their use. Set priorities for research, breeding, and use of Musa genetic resources, ensuring critical links with the four regional banana networks.

== Structure ==
Members of MusaNet belong to one or more of the five thematic research groups focused on the following subjects: Diversity, Conservation, Evaluation, Genomics and Information. Each of these thematic groups has elected a Chair and Co-chair to represent the group at monthly Expert Committee meetings and has developed objectives and a workplan for the next 10 years.

Also present in the Expert Committee are representatives of the four regional banana networks - BAPNET (Asia and the Pacific), BARNESA (Eastern and Southern Africa), Innovate Plantain (Western and Central Africa) and MUSALAC (Latin America and the Caribbean), which geographically cover all the banana producing countries. A representative from the information platform ProMusa is also present at the meetings.

Part of the Diversity Thematic Group, the Taxonomic Advisory Group (TAG) comprises 12 experts that work together on particular projects concerning banana taxonomy, such as developing morphological field descriptors and verifying the genetic integrity of banana germplasm.

== Membership ==
Membership to MusaNet is based on individuals, not institutes, and is solicited by thematic group Chairs and Co-chairs. Members are active in banana genetic resources-related research with a commitment to fruitful collaboration and knowledge exchange.

== Musa collections ==
There are more than 60 banana ex situ collections worldwide located mostly in banana producing countries. The majority of the collections are supported by national funding to conserve banana diversity and conduct related research. Detailed information of the collections can be found on the MusaNet website.

== Activities ==
Projects in MusaNet are developed within and among the five thematic groups.

Some recent activities carried out by MusaNet members are:

- The publication of the revised Global Strategy for the Conservation and Use of Musa Genetic Resources (MusaNet 2016).
- The revision of the Technical Guidelines for the Safe Movement of Musa Germplasm
- Regional workshops on Musa characterization and documentation - held in Cameroon, Uganda, Malaysia and Costa Rica.
- Creation of the Taxonomic Reference Collection - a reference set of accessions representing the spectrum of Musa diversity
- Collecting missions carried out with local partners in Indonesia and Papua New Guinea
- Development of electronic tools used for field characterization: MusaTab and MusaID
- Building plant phytosanitary capacity in national collections through a Virus Ring Test
- Banana genomics workshop organised annually at the Plant and Animal Genome Conference (PAG) in San Diego, US.
- Ongoing development of standardized protocols for the evaluation of Black leaf streak (Black sigatoka), Fusarium wilt and Drought tolerance.

The Musa Germplasm Information System (MGIS) is closely linked with the Information Thematic Group activities. It contains accession-level information of germplasm held in many Musa collections.
