= Neglected and underutilized crop =

Domesticated plant species not part of mainstream agriculture

Neglected and underutilised crops are domesticated plant species used for food, medicine, trading, or cultural practices within local communities but not widely commodified or studied as part of mainstream agriculture. Such crops may be in declining production. They are considered underutilised in scientific inquiry for their perceived potential to contribute to knowledge regarding nutrition, food security, genetic resistance, or sustainability. Other terms to describe such crops include minor, orphan, underused, local, traditional, alternative, minor, niche, or underdeveloped.

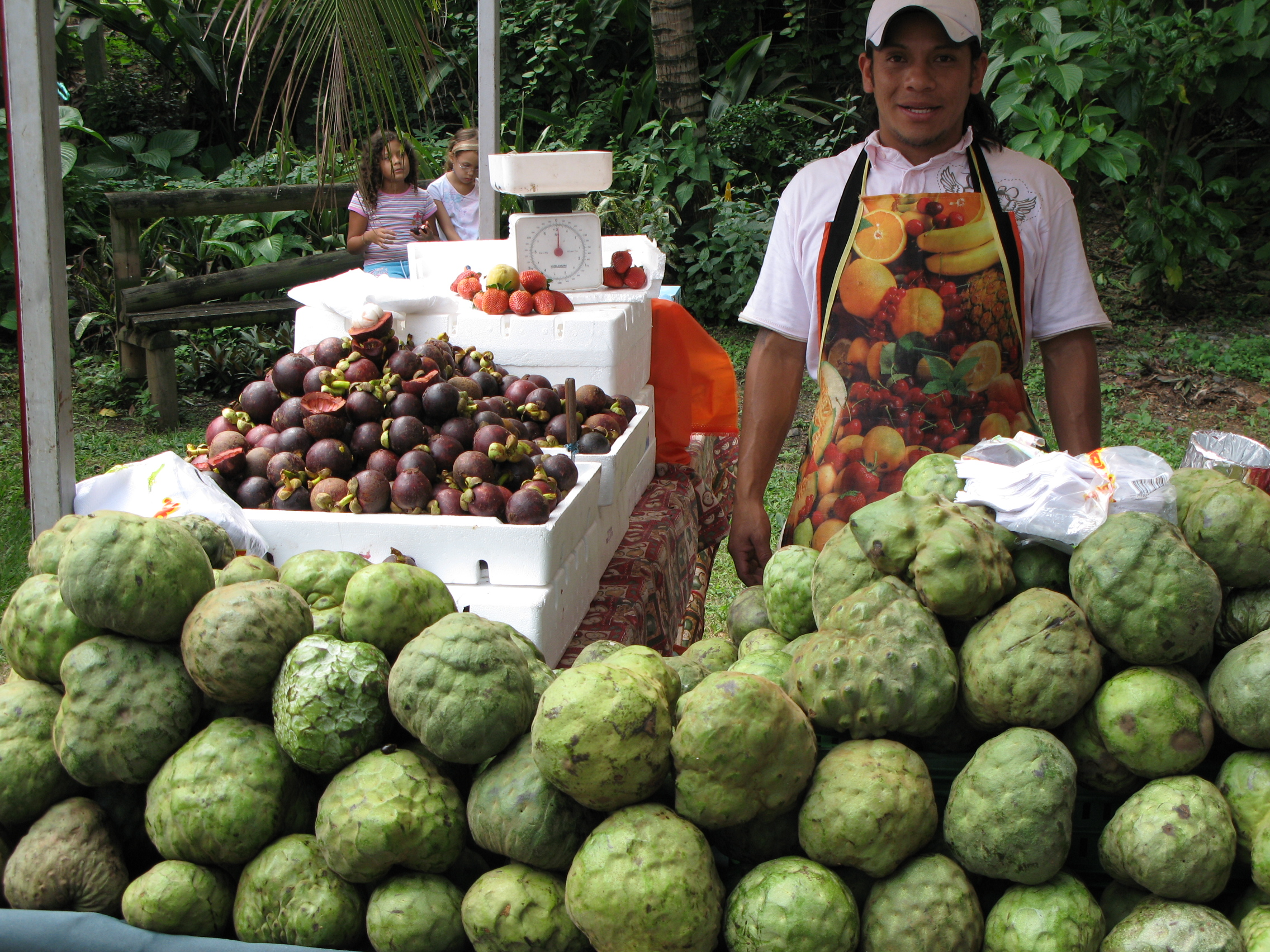
Cherimoya (Annona cherimola) on sale in Cali, Colombia. In left background: domestically produced mangosteen (Garcinia mangostana)

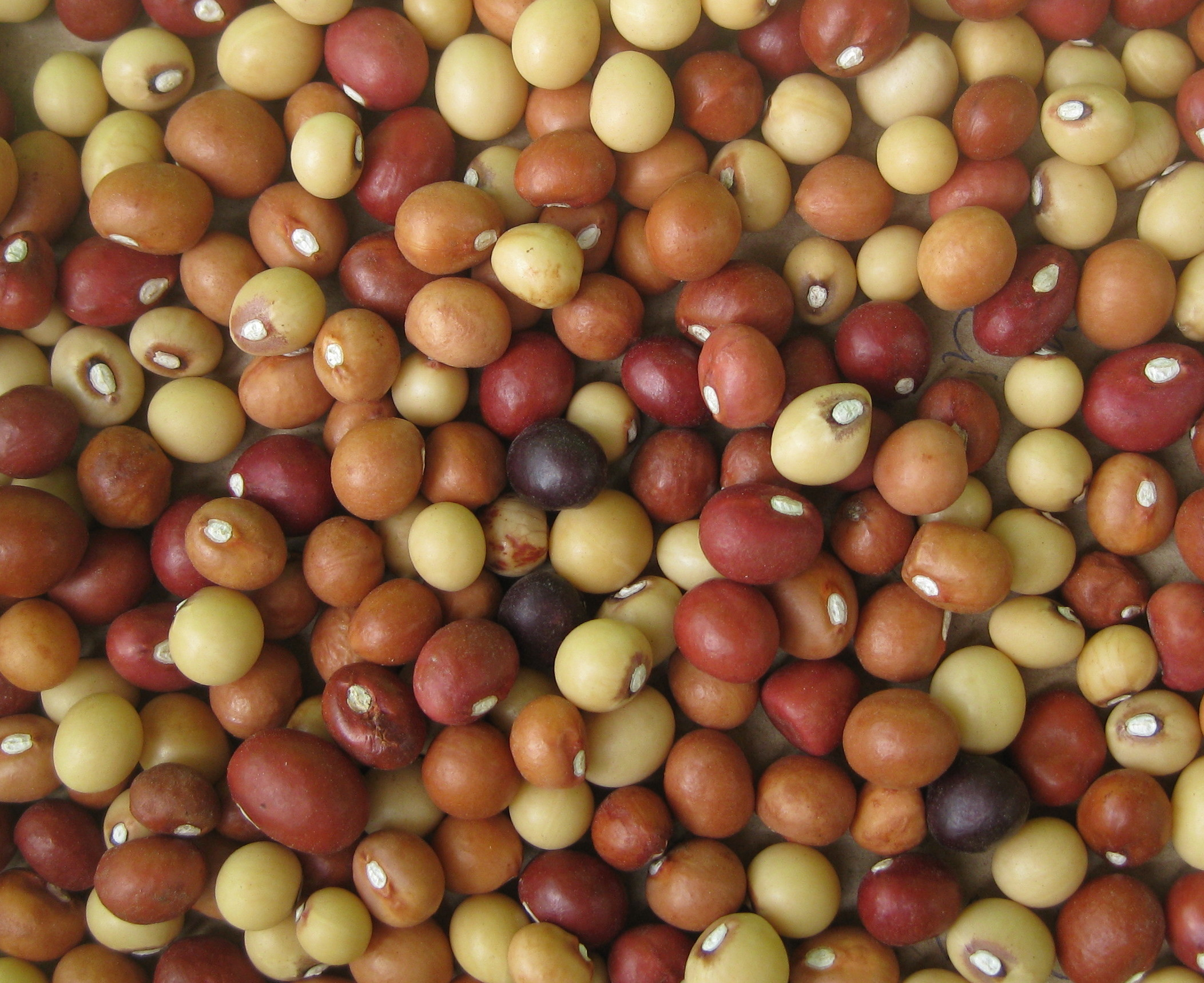
Bambara groundnut (Vigna subterranea) from Buzi district in Mozambique

== Overview ==
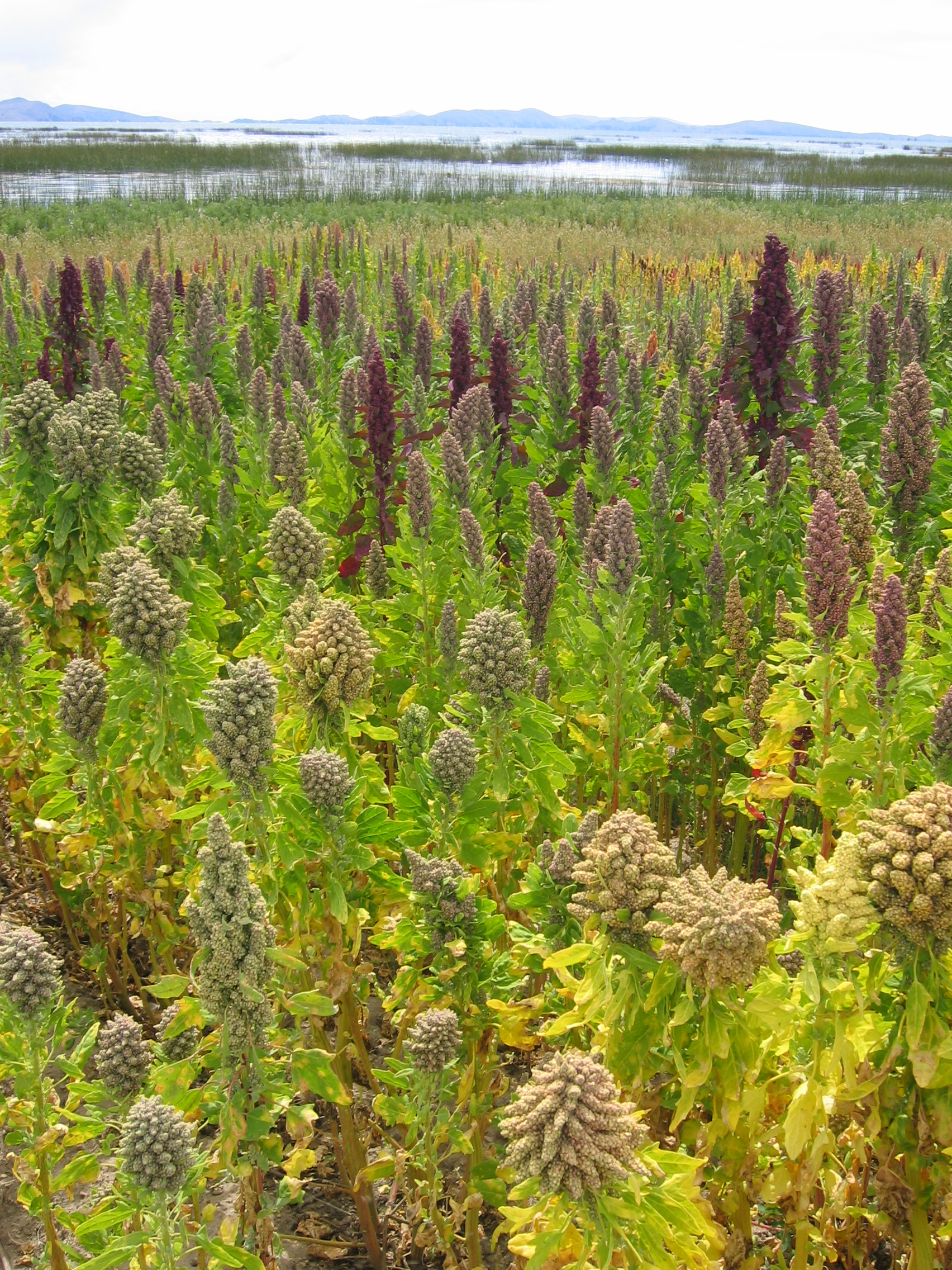
Landscape with quinoa (Chenopodium quinoa), Cachilaya, Bolivia, Province La Paz, Lake Titicaca seen in background.

Three crops—maize, wheat, and rice—account for approximately 50% of the world's consumption of calories and protein, and about 95% of the world's food needs are provided by just 30 species of plants. Despite this, the list of plant species compiled as edible extends to around 7,039 - amount that is expected to increase due to under representation of documented plants in tropical regions such as America and New Guinea -. Out of the total edible plants, only the 5.9% is defined as 'major food crop', but so far, 6,100 have been cultivated. Among the total, there are plants that have been used for food and other uses on a larger scale historically, but whose usage has dropped in modern times.

Reduction in use is due to supply or consumption constraints, poor shelf life, unrecognised nutritional value, poor consumer awareness, and perception as famine food ("poor people's food"), partially due to the modernisation of agricultural practices. Some crops experienced genetic erosion of their gene pool due to this neglect, which resulted in them becoming regarded as lost crops.

As the demand for plant and crop attributes changes (due to reappraisal or discovery of nutritional traits, culinary value, adaptation to climate change, or other reasons), some previously neglected crops, such as oil palm, soybean, and kiwifruit, have overcome such constraints via more large-scale production and use, becoming regarded as globally significant crops. Alongside their commercial potential, many underused crops such as sorghum provide essential environmental services as they have adapted to marginal soil and climate conditions.

Underutilised crops continue to play a vital role in the subsistence and economy of people in low and middle-income countries, particularly in the agro-biodiversity-rich tropics. For example, chirimoya and bambara crops, produced in Colombia and Mozambique respectively, aid the local population in food security, allowing them physical and economic access to sufficient food for meeting their dietary needs, even during a famine.

== Definition ==
There is no consensus on what defines an underutilised crop, but they often display the following attributes:

- Linkage with the cultural heritage of their places of origin
- Local and traditional crops whose distribution, biology, cultivation and uses are poorly documented
- Adaptation to specific agroecological niches and marginal land
- Weak or no formal seed supply systems
- Traditional uses in localized areas
- Produced in traditional production systems with little or no external inputs
- Receive little attention from research, extension services, policy and decision-makers, and consumers
- May be highly nutritious and/or have medicinal properties or other multiple uses

Neglected crops are primarily grown by traditional farmers. These species may be widely distributed beyond their centers of origin but tend to occupy unique niches in the local production and consumption systems. They are critical for the subsistence of local communities yet remain poorly documented and neglected by mainstream research and development activities. Many staple crops, especially in the developing world, are poorly studied by researchers. For example, the Green Revolution saw profound changes in agricultural productivity in Asia, but African crops saw little benefit.

== Examples ==
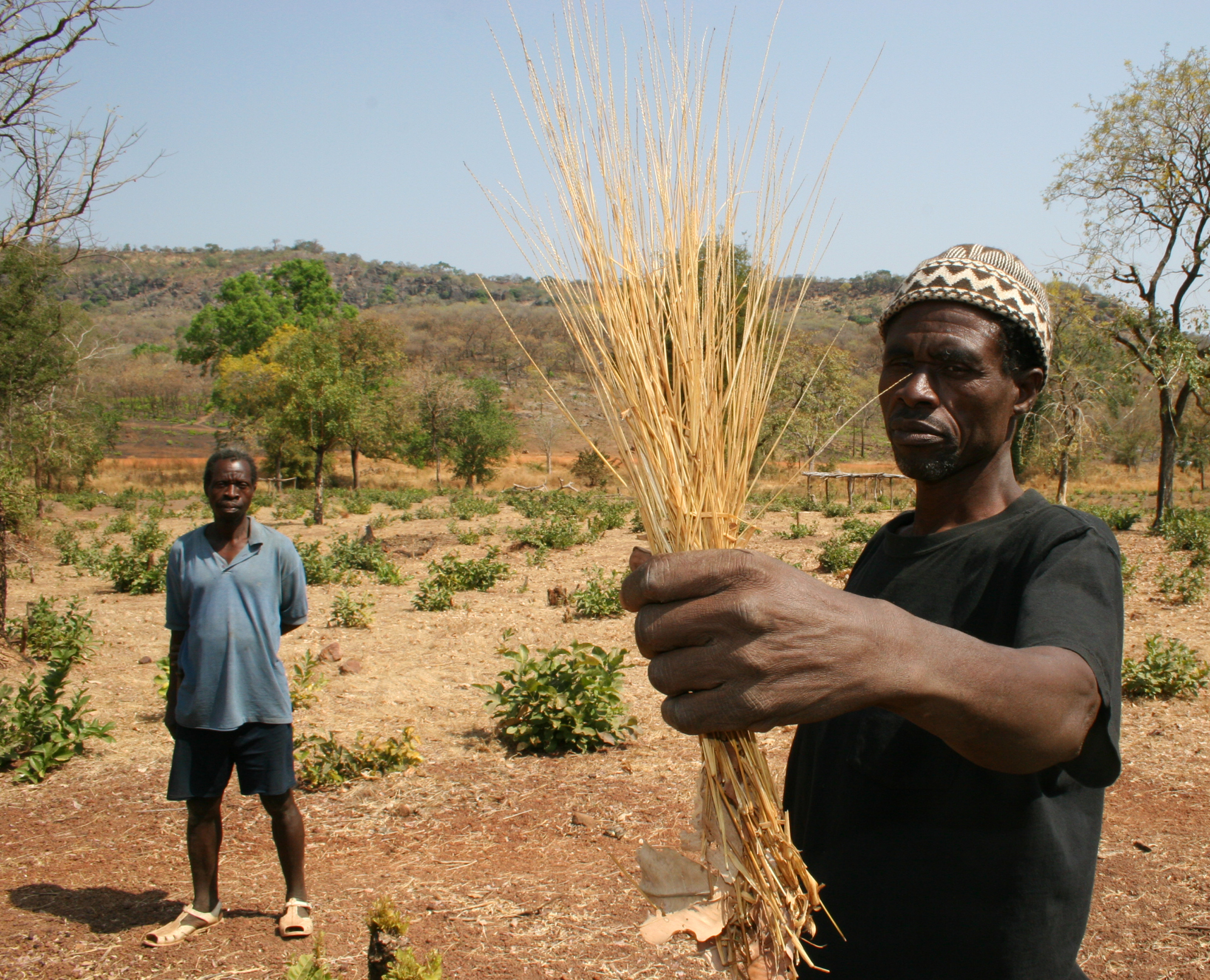
Village chief of Boula Téné, [Senegal] Theodore Mada Keita, holds up the fonio grain (Digitaria exilis) that helps feed his family.

Determination of the underutilized status of a crop varies among researchers. Different criteria and approaches are used to define this particular group of crops.

Neglect refers to the lack of attention a crop may receive through research and development and can be evaluated by how well national and international policy or legal frameworks and research and development programs can support the conservation and sustainable use of a crop. Underutilisation is particular to the geography and potential for a crop to contribute to better diets and production systems. In cases where exotic or diversified species are underutilised in a particular region, these may not necessarily be underutilised in other parts of the world. Below is a non-exhaustive list of neglected and underutilised species.

It is important to recognise the potential negative impact on communities that historically use so-called underutilised crops. For example, as quinoa came into international focus, its price in South America surged by 600%, pushing the grain outside the reach of traditional use communities.

=== Cereal and pseudocereal crops ===
- Amaranthus caudatus
- Quinoa
- Canihua
- Findi
- Echinochloa frumentacea
- Echinochloa utilis
- Finger millet
- Teff
- Buckwheat
- Proso millet
- Little millet
- Kodo millet
- Pearl millet
- Foxtail millet
- Sorghum
- Triticale

=== Fruit and nut species ===
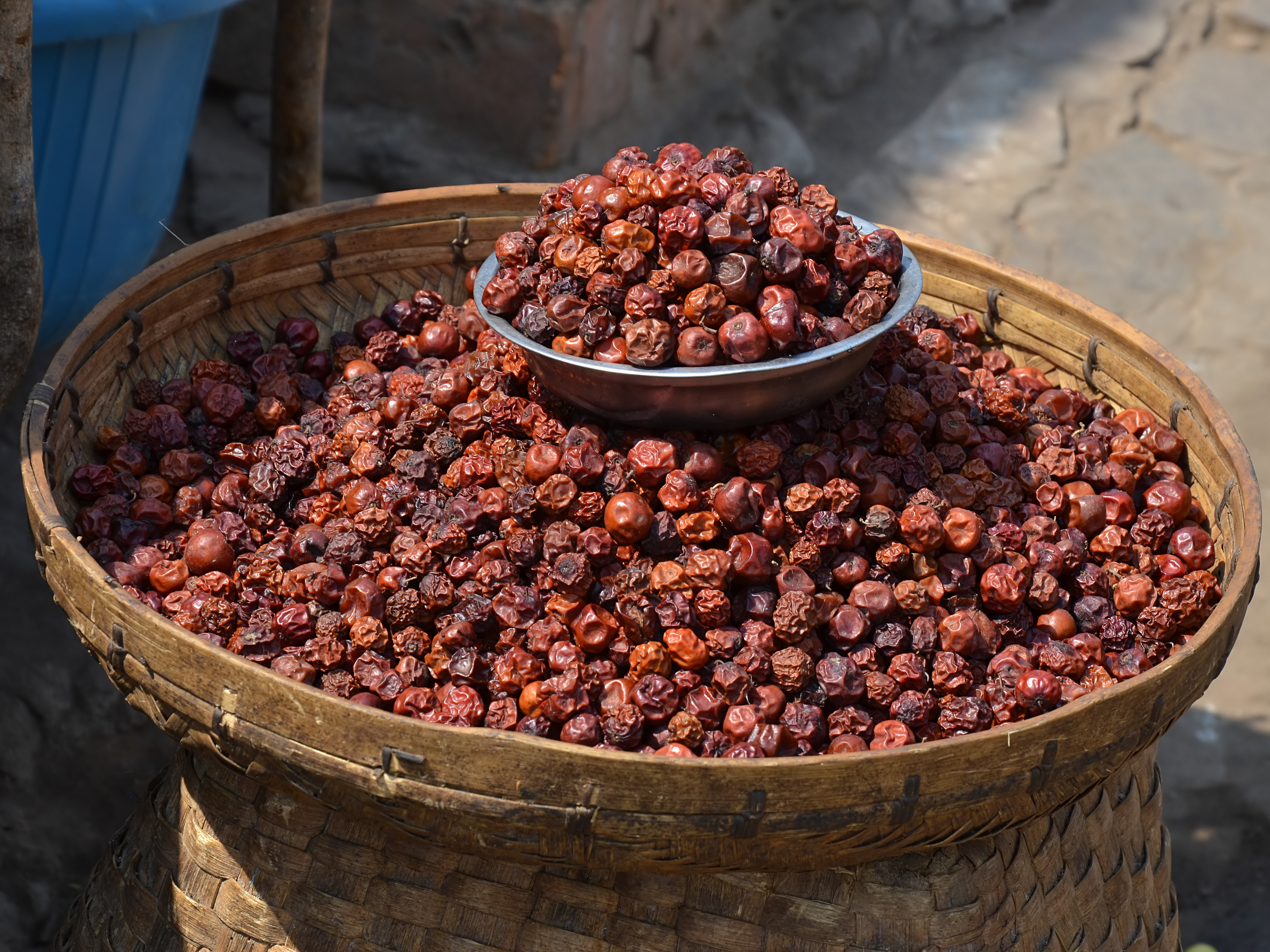
Ziziphus mauritiana (dry fruits) for sale at the Luangwa turn-off on Great East road, Zambia

- African baobab
- Bael
- Cashew
- Cherimoya
- Soursop
- Sweetsop
- Jackfruit
- Common pawpaw
- Carambola
- Bactris gasipaes
- Galip nut
- Carissa edulis
- Chinese hickory (Shanhetao)
- White sapote (Casimiroa)
- Carob
- Choerospondias axillaris
- Pomelo
- Cornelian cherry
- Common hawthorn
- Quince
- Longan
- Oriental persimmon
- Durio zibethinus
- Russian olive
- Indian gooseberry (Emblic)
- Loquat
- Fig
- Mangosteen
- Hippophae rhamnoides
- Hovenia dulcis
- African mango
- Common walnut
- Lagenaria sphaerica
- Lychee
- Sapodilla (Little sapote)
- Rambutan
- Passionfruit
- Pistacia lentiscus
- Mamey sapote
- Almond
- Common guava
- Pomegranate
- Ricinodendron heudelotii
- Salak
- Tamarind
- Okari nut (Terminalia kaernbachii)
- Andean blueberry (Agraz)
- Grapevines
- Ziziphus mauritiana

=== Vegetable and pulse crops ===
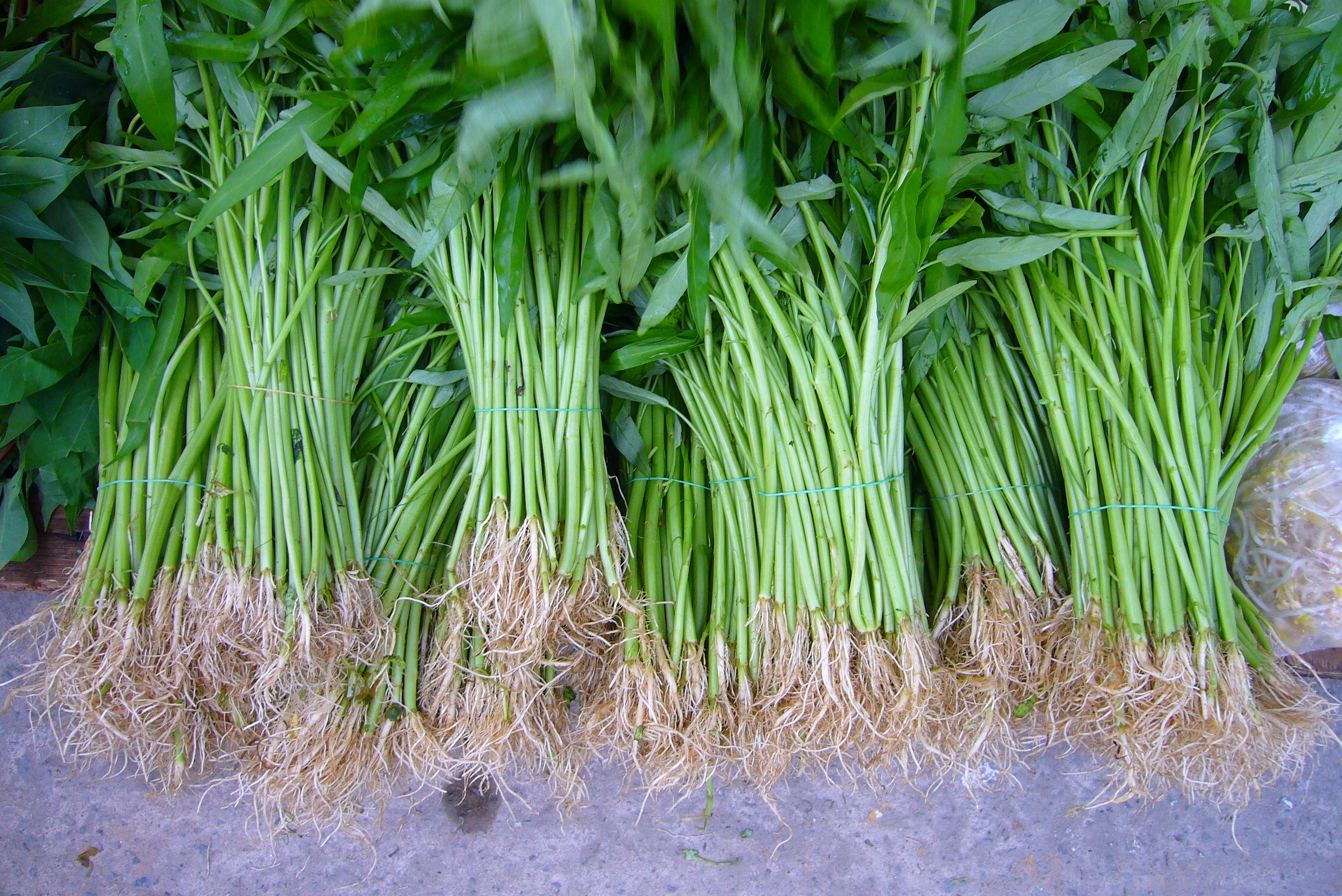
Ipomoea aquatica photographed in the Sunday Market, Kuching, Sarawak, Malaysia

- Amaranths
- Tarragon
- Malabar spinach
- Borage
- Boscia coriacea
- Ethiopian mustard
- Campanula rapunculus
- Jackbeans
- White goosefoot
- Chicory
- Cleome gynandra
- Corchorus spp.
- Crambe cordifolia
- Crotalaria spp.
- Curcuma spp.
- Cucurbita spp. (Squashes, pumpkins, gourds)
- Roselle
- Water spinach (Kangkung)
- Hausa groundnut
- Lablab
- Peavines
- Leucaena leucocephala
- Lupinus mutabilis
- Horsegram
- Momordica spp.
- Moringa oleifera
- Mucuna spp.
- Muscari comosum
- Prickly pear cactus
- Parkia biglobosa
- Parsnip
- Tomatillo
- Indian pokeweed
- Little hogweed
- Winged bean
- Indian marshcress (Rorippa indica)
- Prickly saltwort
- European black nightshade
- African yam bean
- Philippine spinach
- Moth bean (Matki)
- Adzuki (Red mung bean)
- Bambara nut
- Ricebean

=== Root and tuber crops ===
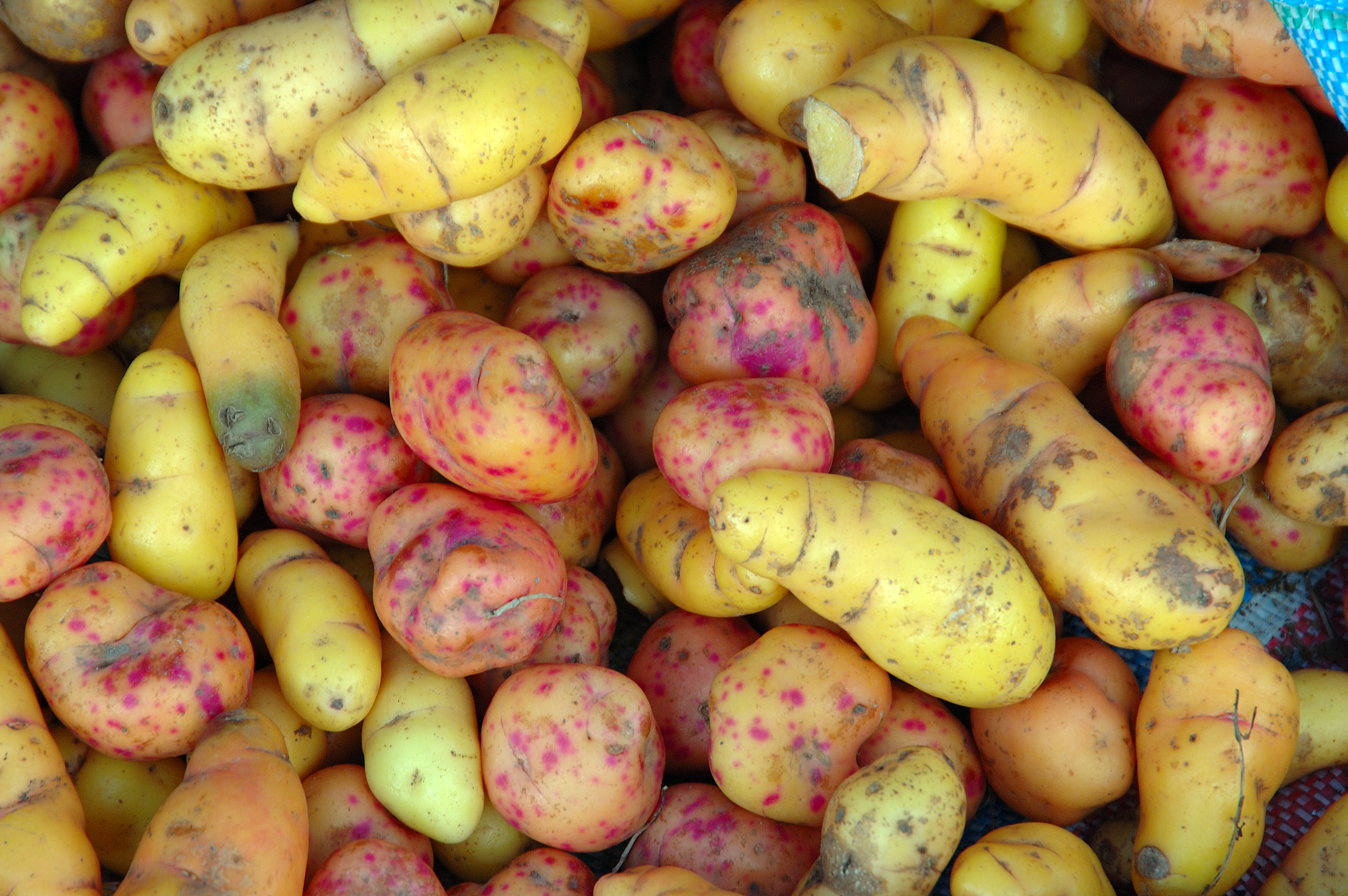
Ulluco tubers (Ullucus tuberosus) for sale in southern Peru

- Alocasia spp.
- Arracacha
- Calathea allouia
- Canna spp.
- Taro
- Dioscorea spp.
- Gastrodia sesamoides
- Harpagophytum procumbens
- Orchis spp.
- Uqa
- Mexican turnip (Jícama)
- Kaffir potato (Rizga)
- Yacón (Peruvian groundapple)
- Hausa potato
- Marama bean
- Ulluco
- Wild cowpea
- American taro (Tannia)

=== Other crops ===
- Ethiopian banana

=== Industrial underutilized crops ===
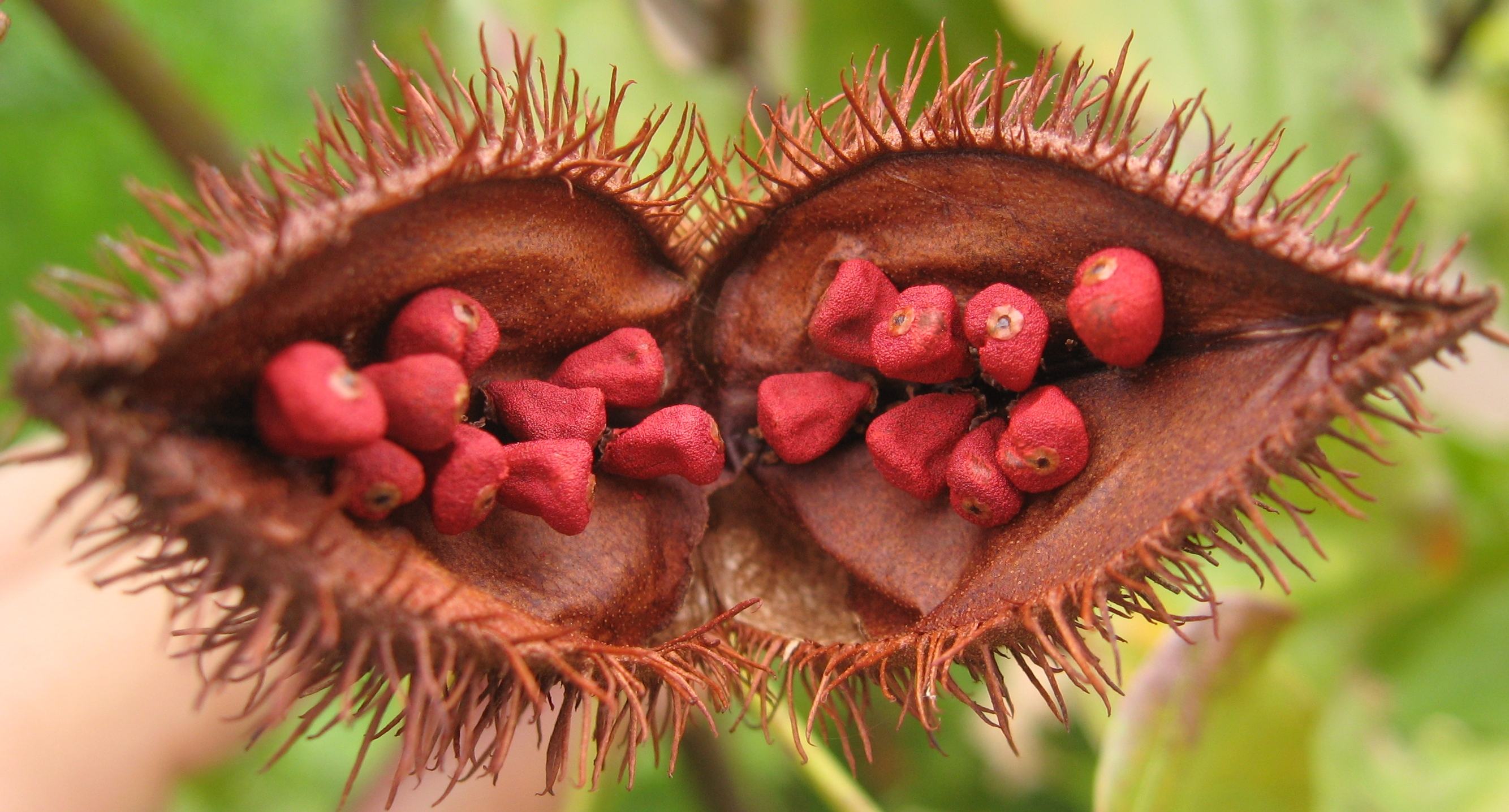
Bixa orellana fruit open, showing the seeds from which annatto is extracted, photographed in Campinas, Brazil

==== Oil seeds ====
- Acrocomia aculeata
- Bactris gasipaes
- Balanites aegyptiaca
- Butyrospermum paradoxum
- Safflower
- Bitter apple (Colocynth)
- Cuphea spp.
- Euphorbia lagascae
- Jatropha curcas
- Physaria fendleri
- Perilla frutescens
- Mongongo
- Castor bean
- Sesame
- Jojoba
- Vernonia spp.

==== Latex/rubber/gums ====
- Couma utilis
- Guayule
- Takhtajaniantha tau-saghyz
- Russian dandelion

==== Fibres ====
- Kenaf

==== Starch/sugar ====
- Carob
- Metroxylon sagu
- Hogweed

==== Dye ====
- Achiote (Bixa)
- Safflower
- Roselle

== International events that fostered underutilized crops ==
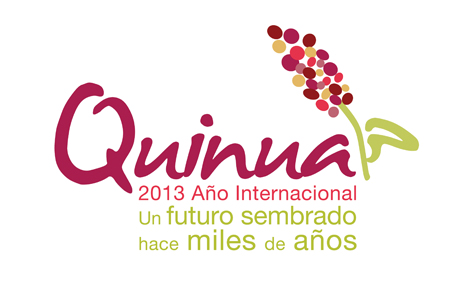
Logo of the international year of Quinoa 2013

- 1987 - Establishment of the International Centre for Underutilized Crops (ICUC)
- 1996 - The FAO Global Plan of Action for Plant Genetic Resources for Food and Agriculture emphasized the importance of underutilized crops
- 1999 - At an international workshop held in Chennai, India, the Consultative Group of International Agricultural Research (CGIAR) recognized the contribution that neglected and underutilized species make to food security, rural incomes and combating poverty
- 2002 - Establishment of the Global Facilitation Unit of Underutilized Species (GFU) of the Global Forum on Agricultural Research (GFAR), and was housed within Bioversity International, Rome, Italy.
- 2008 - Establishment of Crops for the Future (CFF) which is a merging of ICUC and GFU, based in Malaysia
- 2011 - Establishment of Crops for the Future Research Centre (CFFRC) in Malaysia
- 2012 - The international Crops for the 21st Century seminar held on 10–13 December 2012 in Córdoba, Spain aimed to discuss major topics related to underlining the role of neglected and underutilised species to address food and agriculture challenges in the future.
- 2013 - Official launch of the International Year of Quinoa (IYQ-2013), intended to increase awareness, understanding and knowledge about quinoa and its importance on food security.
- 2013 - 3rd International Conference on Neglected and Underutilized Species, Accra, Ghana - to ensure that research on neglected and underutilized species (NUS) is demand-oriented and that results are better shared and applied, researchers, extension agents, the private sector and farmers must engage in more collaboration - in sub-Saharan Africa.

== See also ==
- Food biodiversity
- Heirloom plant
- List of useful plants
- Slow Food
- Subsistence farming
