= Food biodiversity =

Food biodiversity is defined as "the diversity of plants, animals and other organisms used for food, covering the genetic resources within species, between species and provided by ecosystems."

Food biodiversity can be considered from two main perspectives: production and consumption. From a consumption perspective, food biodiversity describes the diversity of foods in human diets and their contribution to dietary diversity, cultural identity and good nutrition. Production of food biodiversity looks at the thousands of food products, such as fruits, nuts, vegetables, meat and condiments sourced from agriculture and from the wild (e.g. forests, uncultivated fields, water bodies). Food biodiversity covers the diversity between species, for example different animal and crop species, including those considered neglected and underutilized species. Food biodiversity also comprises the diversity within species, for example different varieties of fruit and vegetables, or different breeds of animals.

Food diversity, diet diversity nutritional diversity, are also terms used in the new diet culture spawned by Brandon Eisler, in the study known as Nutritional Diversity.

== Consumption of food biodiversity ==
=== Food biodiversity in consumption ===
Promoting diversity of foods and species consumed in human diets, in particular, has potential co-benefits for public health and sustainable food systems perspective. Food biodiversity provides necessary nutrients for quality diets and is an essential part of local food systems, cultures, and food security. From a conservation point of view, diets based on a wide variety of species place less pressure on a single species. According to the FAO, 75% of the world's food comes from 12 plant species and five from animals. School gardens and home-grown school feeding programmes offer a promising but currently underused pathway for reintroducing biodiversity into children's diets. A 2025 scoping review of 124 studies across 35 countries found that the plant species used in these programmes fall well short of the edible plant diversity available locally.

=== Effects on nutrition and health ===
A method of measurement for dietary diversity is the Household Dietary Diversity Score (HDDS). HDDS sums up the number of food groups digested in a day.

Nutritionally, diversity in food is associated with higher micronutrient adequacy of diets. In some cases, diverse diets have been proven to have benefits on one's health. For instance, the introduction of a wide variety of foods and food allergens during the first year of life can lead to a heightened intake of central nutrients and contribute to positive changes in the structure and function of the gut microbiome. The diversification of species distributes quantities of micronutrients, macronutrients, and calories to the human diet. Among micronutrients, the nutrients for humans that are imperative to survive are A, eight types of B vitamins, C, D, E, and K. Their functions range from fighting infections, strengthening bones, healing wounds, and regulating hormones. When species that provide superior macro and micronutrient densities are consumed less compared to more commonly consumed species, humans don't achieve nearly the same benefits. For instance, rice and wheat represent staple foods in most cultures; However, teff and minor millets have more significant concentrations of protein, fat, and iron.

Considering the profound impact food biodiversity has on health, food varieties can have potential risks. Wild foods (fish, plants, tree foods, wild meat, insects and fungi) serve as a crucial source of dietary diversity and essential micronutrients; especially in rural communities, foods can occasionally pose health and food safety risks. Additionally, plants and animals carry diseases that are anthropogenically passed or are zoonotic. In the U.S., there are 31 known pathogens, of the known pathogens 9.4 million people become ill from food-borne illness, 55,961 people are hospitalized from illness, and 1,351 deaths. On a global scale, the decline in genetic diversity weakens the resilience of food systems, leaving them vulnerable to various challenges, encompassing pests, pathogens, and severe weather. This poses a significant risk to global food security. Furthermore, food biodiversity, as measured by the absolute number of biological species in the usual diet, was negatively associated with the total mortality rate and cause-specific deaths due to cancer, heart disease, respiratory disease, and digestive disease among ~450,000 adults from nine European countries.

== History ==
Food biodiversity in the Neolithic era represented a shift from hunting and scavenging to agriculture where people started herding animals and cultivating plants. These tactics led to the production of things like wheat, barley, dogwood fruits, grapes, and hazelnuts. The Green Revolution represented the beginning of a new revolution and modernization. The beginning of the Green Revolution created the development of large yields of diversity in specific species. This resulted in new strains of rice and wheat and an increased food supply from the 1940s to the 1960s, but consequently led to the reduction of land used in agriculture. Early techniques utilized pesticides and fertilizers to gain productivity. The approaches of modernization led to techniques used today to increase food biodiversity within a single species. The colonization and trade amongst resources pioneered the future of food diversity in diets. From a food biodiversity point of view, the Columbian Exchange represented the movement of species and ideas from the Old World to the New World. Foods like potato variety, maize, and cassava were among a few species introduced. The event was an early result of the globalization of food where the sharing of knowledge about food was shared.

== Impacts on food biodiversity ==
=== Role of biodiversity in production systems ===
Conservation and management of broad-based genetic diversity within the domesticated species have improved agricultural production for 10,000 years. However, diverse natural populations have provided food and other products for much longer. High biodiversity can maximize production levels, which are sustained through the beneficial impact of ecosystem services for agricultural, modified, and natural ecosystems. Conversely, reliance on a narrow portfolio of crops or crop varieties can jeopardize food production systems. This is illustrated by the Great Famine of Ireland. Potatoes were introduced into Ireland from the New World in about 1600, and they became the major food source of most Irish people. The wind-borne Potato blight fungus spread throughout the country. In 1845-1847 and caused almost complete failure of the potato crop. It is estimated that 1 million people died of starvation, cholera, and typhoid.

=== Effects on climate change ===
Human food biodiversity between species is put at risk when there are severe alterations to the climates surrounding crops. Extreme or abnormal weather events can cause unfavorable effects on crop yields, poor communities, rural farmers, and food sellers. Due to these events, it becomes increasingly difficult for poor populations to absorb global commodity price changes. After droughts in Russia and China, and floods in Australia, India, Pakistan, and Europe in (time) the World Bank in 2011 concluded that 44 million people returned to poverty. However, when crops are produced in biodiverse multi-functional landscapes, farmers can accommodate changing conditions. In 2010-12, above-average heat temperatures caused premature budding of cherries and lower yields of corn across the U.S. Corn Belt. Since the U.S. Corn Belt makes up a third of the world's global supply, climate prevention tactics protect the plants from future damaging catastrophes.

=== Effects of technology and agricultural practices ===
Crop diversification practices and technology are being used to bring safer practices, more food diversity, and richness to food biodiversity. Depending on the geographic region, the protection of food biodiversity includes practice such as agricultural practices like sustainable agriculture, organic agriculture permaculture, conservation agriculture, agroecology, agroforestry, sustainable soil management, sustainable forest management, agroforestry, diversification of aquaculture, and ecosystem approach to fisheries and ecosystem restoration. Of 91 countries 81% practice these behaviors. For example, inventory management techniques are used in determining the rate of consumption, and 78% of studies indicate that agroecological practices provide beneficial outcomes for those in low and middle-income countries. Agro-ecological practice creates comprehensive strategies integrating ecological, health, social, and economic factors into planning and executing agricultural and food systems. Biotechnology allows farmers to grow crops of desired traits that give plant species biological advantages. These advantages are immunity to diseases, tolerance to drought, heat, cold or salinity, flavor enhancement, and superior growth traits. The Advantages of biotechnology have gone towards less prosperous areas to create better livelihoods. Vietnam farmers have gained an extra income stretching from $6.85 to $12.55 for each additional dollar invested in biotech seeds compared to conventional seeds.

=== Effects of global trade ===
Global trade allows people access to a wider variety of foods from different regions and climates, giving them more complex and balanced diets. The global trade model can be used to reflect the impact of trade on food concentrations and nutrition security. Food biodiversity plays a critical role in the livelihood of individual countries. Trade is reliant on quality, demand, cost, and if the food is a staple food. Bhutan is an example of a country whose landscape provides a wide array of nutritional diversity. The nation is made up of 40 species of wild vegetables and 350 species of mushrooms used for food and as a profitable source of revenue. The UNCDAT map 1 represents different basic food needs in countries by calculating the amount of trade balance divided by the total imports. The map indicates that the concentrations of foods needed are different globally because import and export frequencies vary.

=== Ecosystem services ===
A wide range of biologically diverse populations in natural ecosystems and in/near agricultural ecosystems maintain essential ecological functions critical for food production. Such populations contribute positively to, for example, nutrient cycling, decomposition of organic matter, crusted or degraded soil rehabilitation, pest and disease regulation, water quality maintenance, and pollination. Maintaining species diversity while building on and enhancing ecosystem functions reduces external input requirements by increasing nutrient availability, improving water use, and soil structure, and controlling pests. Heirloom rice varieties in the Philippines' Cordillera Autonomous region hold deep cultural, spiritual, and historical value, showcasing the potential of food biodiversity in preserving cultural heritage.

=== Traits ===
Genetic diversity within food species is allows for a wide range of minerals, vitamins, and resistance, creating various benefits. For example:

- Wild subspecies of tomatoes (Solanum lycopersicum chmielewskii) were crossbred with cultivated tomato species. After 10 generations, new tomato strains with larger fruits were produced. There was a marked increase in pigmentation. The content of soluble solid, mainly fructose, glucose and other sugars increased.
- A barley plant from Ethiopia provides a gene that protects the barley crop from the lethal yellow dwarf virus.
- Host resistance gene, Xa21, from Oryza longistaminata is integrated into the genome of Oryza sativa for a broad range resistance to rice blight disease caused by Xanthomonas oryzae pv. oryzae

== See also ==
- Biodiversity
- Agricultural biodiversity
