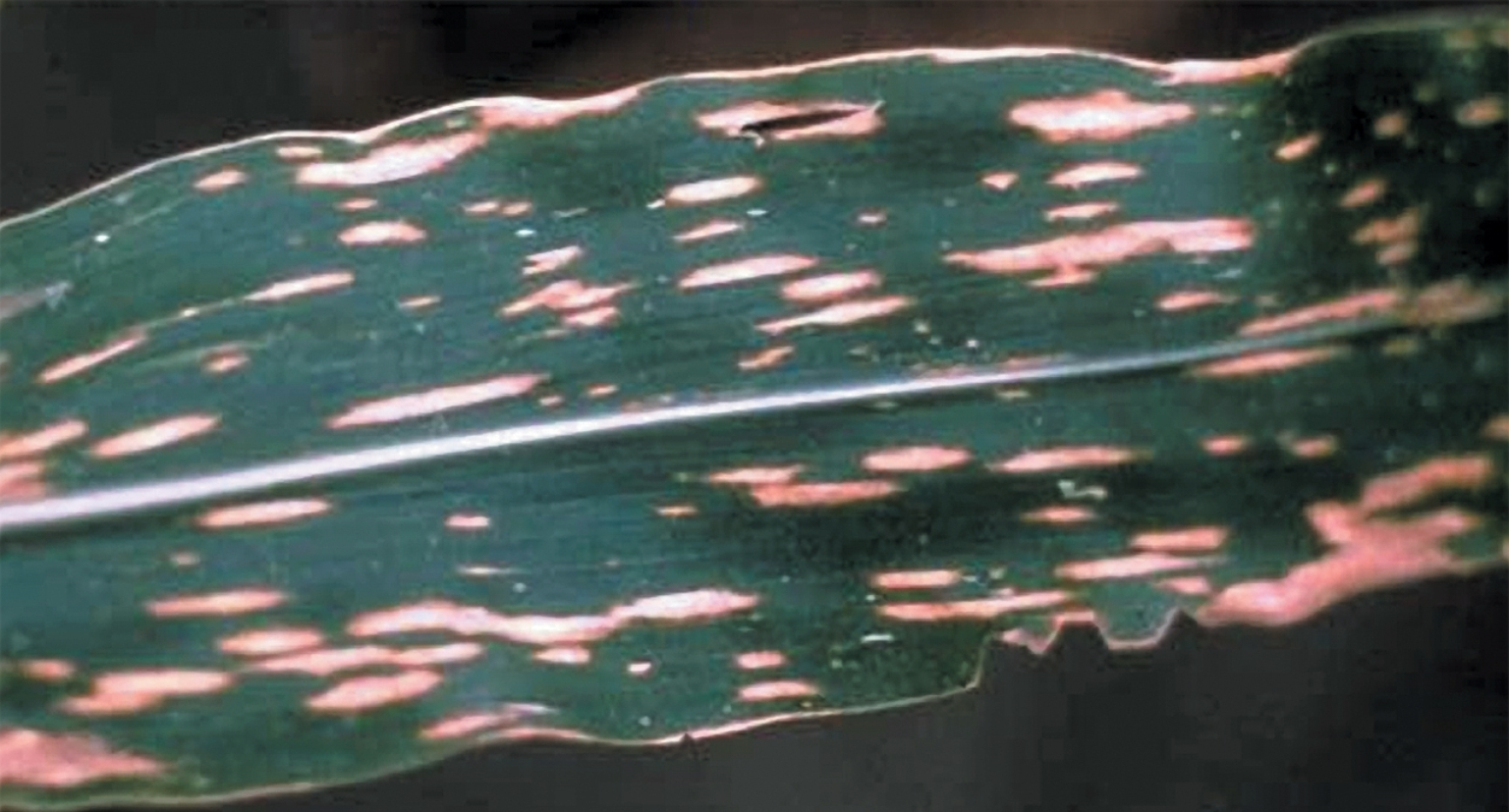
- Symptoms of Cochliobolus heterostrophus on maize

Scientific classification
- Domain: Eukaryota
- Kingdom: Fungi
- Division: Ascomycota
- Class: Dothideomycetes
- Order: Pleosporales
- Family: Pleosporaceae
- Genus: Cochliobolus
- Species: C. heterostrophus

Binomial name
- Cochliobolus heterostrophus (Drechsler) Drechsler, (1934)

Synonyms
- Bipolaris maydis (Y. Nisik. & C. Miyake) Shoemaker,(1959); Drechslera maydis (Y. Nisik. & C. Miyake) Subram. & B.L. Jain, (1966); Helminthosporium maydis Y. Nisik. & C. Miyake, (1926); Ophiobolus heterostrophus Drechsler, (1925)

= Cochliobolus heterostrophus =

Species of fungus

Cochliobolus heterostrophus is a fungal plant pathogen. It can cause southern corn leaf blight in maize.

Cochliobolus heterostrophus is found in many tropical regions and in the southern part of the US. Cochliobolus, although not currently the most economically serious disease, can be a very serious crop disease. C. heterostrophus (race O) was considered a mild pathogen of corn, and was of little worry to those growing maize crops. It was not until the 1970s that C. heterostrophus (race T) destroyed more than 15% of the U.S. corn crop. Race T differed from race O in the sense that it produced T-toxin (host-selective toxin). The corn planted in the 1970s carried T-cms; T-cms was particularly susceptible to T-toxin. T-toxin is considered to be related to a family of linear polyketides.

This organism's appeal among genetic analysts lends itself to the organism's superior tractability when "homologous recombination between transforming DNA and target genomic sequences" takes place. This "facilitates functional analysis by site-specific gene deletion."
