= Afro-Asian Rural Development Organization =

Inter-governmental organization

African-Asian Rural Development Organization (AARDO), formed in 1962, is an autonomous inter-governmental organization comprising 34 nations: 18 from Africa and 15 from Asia as full members, and one associate member from Asia. AARDO is devoted to developing understanding among members for better appreciation of each other's problems and to explore, collectively, opportunities for coordination of efforts for promoting welfare and eradication of thirst, hunger, illiteracy, disease and poverty amongst hundreds of millions of rural people. AARDO has its headquarters in New Delhi, India. India, one of the founding members of the AARDO, is the largest contributor in terms of membership.

== Member states ==
- Burkina Faso
- Arab Republic of Egypt
- Federal Democratic Republic of Ethiopia
- Republic of Gambia
- Republic of Ghana
- Republic of Kenya
- Republic of Liberia
- Great Socialist People's Libyan Arab Jamahiriya
- Republic of Malawi
- Republic of Mauritius
- Kingdom of Morocco
- Federal Republic of Nigeria
- Republic of Sierra Leone
- Republic of the Sudan
- Republic of Zambia
- People's Republic of Bangladesh
- Republic of China (Taiwan)
- Republic of India
- Republic of Iraq
- Japan
- Hashemite Kingdom of Jordan
- Republic of Korea
- Republic of Lebanon
- Malaysia
- Sultanate of Oman
- Islamic Republic of Pakistan
- Republic of the Philippines
- Syrian Arab Republic
- Republic of Yemen
- Kingdom of Eswatini (Swaziland)

== History ==
The first Afro-Asian Conference on Rural Reconstruction was held in New Delhi in January 1961. The President of India inaugurated the conference which was attended by twenty three countries and five international organizations. At the end of the conference, the African-Asian Rural Reconstruction Organization was formed.

== Secretaries general ==
Name	Country	Tenure
Dr. Manoj Nardeosingh	Mauritius	Since 3 Sept 2019
Eng. Wassfi Hassan El-Sreihin	Jordan	3 Sept 2011– 2 Sept 2019
Dr. Abdalla Yahia Adam	Sudan	3 Sept 2003– 2 Sept 2011
Dr. Bahar Munip	Malaysia	3 Sept 1997 – 2 Sept 2003
Mr. Ahmed Abdelwahed Khalil	Egypt	3 Sept 1991 – 2 Sept 1997
Mr. B.C. Gangopadhyay	India	2 Sept 1985 – 2 Sept 1991
Dr. B.S. Minhas	India	2 Feb 1981 – 1 Sept 1985
Mr. S.M. Osman	Egypt	4 Oct 1974 – 12 Nov 1979
Mr. Krishan Chand	India	17 May 1965 – 4 Oct 1974
Mr. Keshav Dutt Sharma	India	4 Apr 1962 – 16 May 1965
