= Southern corn leaf blight =

Fungal disease of maize

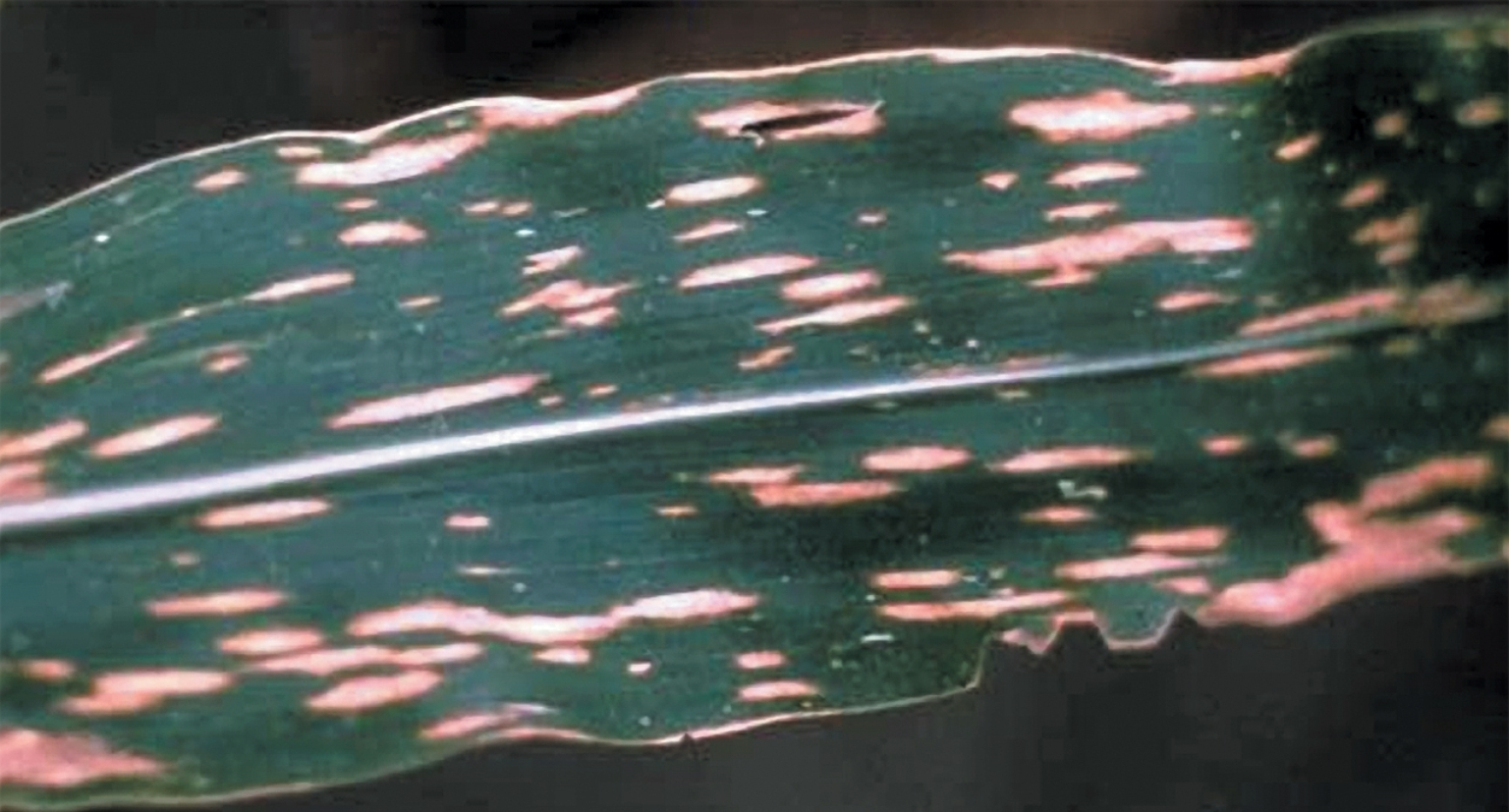
- Southern corn leaf blight on maize
- Causal agents: Cochliobolus heterostrophus

Southern corn leaf blight (SCLB) is a fungal disease of maize caused by the plant pathogen Bipolaris maydis (also known as Cochliobolus heterostrophus in its teleomorph state).

The fungus is an Ascomycete and can use conidia or ascospores to infect. There are three races of B. maydis: Race O, Race C, and Race T; SCLB symptoms vary depending on the infectious pathogen's race. Race T is infectious to corn plants with the Texas male sterile cytoplasm (cms-T maize) and this vulnerability was the cause of the United States SCLB epidemic of 1969-1970 For this reason, Race T is of particular interest. While SCLB thrives in warm, damp climates, the disease can be found in many of the world's maize-growing areas. Typical management practices include breeding for host resistance, cultural controls and fungicide use.

== Hosts ==
The primary host for Southern corn leaf blight is Zea mays, or maize, known as corn in the United States.

Various types of corn with normal cytoplasm (N) are vulnerable to Race O. They have cytoplasmic resistance to the T-toxin of Bipolaris maydis (produced by Race T). The absence of a gene found only in plants with Texas male sterile cytoplasm is the reason for this resistance. Corn plants with T-cms cytoplasm have maternally inherited the gene T-urf 13, which encodes for a protein component of the inner mitochondrial membrane. T-toxin acts on this portion of the mitochondria. In a similar manner, Race C is only pathogenic to hosts with cytoplasm male-sterile C.

Bipolaris maydis can also infect sorghum and teosinte.

Table 1. Race Overview

Race / Toxin produced	Susceptible Host
Race O / O-toxin	Maize with normal cytoplasm (N)- most maize plants
Race T / T-toxin	Maize with Texas male sterile cytoplasm (T-cms)- these plants have gene T-urf 13, which encodes for T-toxin's site of action
Race C / C-toxin	Maize with cytoplasm male sterile C (C-cms)- currently found only in China

== Symptoms ==
Symptoms vary depending on which race is present. The telltale symptom of SCLB is the presence of leaf lesions.

Lesions when Race O is present are tan in color with buff to brown borders. They begin as small, diamond-shaped lesions and elongate within the veins to become larger and rectangular. Race O's lesions remain within the leaves of the maize plant. Lesion size ranges from 2 to 6 millimeters wide and 3 to 22 millimeters long.

Lesions caused by Race T are tan with yellow-green or chlorotic halos. Later on, lesions have red to dark brown borders and can spread to all other above-ground parts of the plant including the stem, sheath, and ear. The shape of lesions are elliptical or spindle and can be larger than lesions caused by Race O, at 6 to 12 millimeters wide by 6 to 27 millimeters long. Race T infection causes seedlings to wilt, and they die within three or four weeks.

Lesions caused by Race C are necrotic and have been found to be about 5 millimeters long. They also tend to cause wilt.

To conclude, B. maydis can infect the leaf, sheaths, ear husks, ears, cobs, shanks, and stalks. If infection of the shank occurs early enough the ear may be killed prematurely which causes the ear to drop. SCLB affected kernels will be covered in a felty, black mold, which may cause cob rot. Ear rot is more extensive with Race T on T-cms corn. Seedlings that become infected may wilt and die within a view weeks of the planting date.

Because symptoms are a plant response and similar ones can be seen with other plant pathogens, Bipolaris maydis infection can be confirmed microscopically. The sign (actual pathogen presence) of SCLB is its conidia. They are visible under a microscope and are usually brown and tapered with round edges. Northern corn leaf blight often occurs when southern corn leaf blight is present, and lesions distinguish between the two. SCLB lesions are more parallel sided, lighter, and smaller in comparison to NCLB

== Disease cycle ==
The disease cycle of Cocholiobolus heterostrophus involves the release of either asexual conidia or sexual ascospores to infect corn plants. The asexual cycle is known to occur in nature and is of primary concern. Upon favorable moist and warm conditions, conidia (the primary inoculum) are released from lesions of an infected corn plant and carried to nearby plants via wind or splashing rain. Once conidia have landed on the leaf or sheath of a healthy plant, Bipolaris maydis will germinate on the tissue by way of polar germ tubes. The germ tubes either penetrate through the leaf or enter through a natural opening such as the stomata. The parenchymatous leaf tissue is invaded by the mycelium of the fungus; cells of the leaf tissue subsequently begin to turn brown and collapse. These lesions give rise to conidiophores which, upon favorable conditions, can either further infect the original host plant (kernels, husks, stalks, leaves) or release conidia to infect other nearby plants. The term 'favorable conditions' implies that water is present on the leaf surface and temperature of the environment is between 60 and 80 degrees Fahrenheit. Under these conditions, spores germinate and penetrate the plant in 6 hours. The fungus overwinters in the corn debris as mycelium and spores, waiting once again for these favorable spring conditions. The generation time for new inoculum is only 51 hours.

As previously mentioned, Bipolaris maydis also has a sexual stage with ascospores, but this has only been observed in laboratory culture. Its ascospores (within asci) are found in the ascocarp Cochiobolus, a type of perithecium rare in nature. Thus, the main route of SCLB infection is asexual via conidial infection.

== Environment ==
Southern corn leaf blight can be found throughout the world, almost everywhere maize is grown. The amount of rainfall, relative humidity, and temperature of the area is critical to the spread and survival of disease. This is because SCLB favors a warm, moist climate. An environment with warm temperatures (68 to 90 degrees Fahrenheit) and a high humidity level is particularly conducive to SCLB. By contrast, long and sunny growing seasons with dry conditions are highly unfavorable. Race O is the most widely distributed of the three types. Race T is found in areas where Texas male sterile genotypes are planted, and Race C has been discovered only in China.

== Management ==
The best practice for management of southern corn leaf blight is breeding for host resistance. Both single gene and polygene resistance sources have been discovered. Normal cytoplasm maize can resist both Race T and Race C, hence the more widespread presence of Race O. In some resistant hybrids flecking may be found, but is only a reaction to resistance and will not cause loss of economic significance.

Other methods of control can prevent the spread of all races. For example, it is important to manage crop debris between growing seasons, as B. maydis overwinters in the leaf and sheath debris. Tillage can be used to help encourage breakdown of any remaining debris. It has been observed that burying residues by plowing has reduced the occurrence of SCLB as opposed to minimal tillage, which can leave residue on soil surface. Another form of cultural control used to limit southern corn leaf blight is crop rotation with non-host crops.

Additionally, foliar fungicides may be used. Foliar disease control is critical from 14 days before to 21 days after tasseling, this is the most susceptible time for damages from leaf blight to occur. The fungicides should be applied to plants infected by SCLB immediately once lesions become apparent. Depending on the environmental conditions, re-applications may be necessary during the growing season.

== Importance ==
Farming practices and optimal environmental conditions for the propagation of B. maydis in the United States led to an epidemic in 1970. In the early 1960s, seed corn companies began to use male sterile cytoplasm so that they could eliminate the previous need for hand detasseling to save both money and time. This seed was eventually bred into hybrid crops until there was an estimated 90% prevalence of Texas male sterile cytoplasm (Tcms) maize, vulnerable to the newly generated Race T. The disease, which first appeared in the United States in 1968, reached epidemic status in 1970 and destroyed about 15% of the corn belt's crop production that year. In 1970 the disease began in the southern United States and by mid-August had spread north to Minnesota and Maine. It is estimated that Illinois alone suffered a loss of 250 million bushels of corn to SCLB. The monetary value of the lost corn crop was estimated at one billion US dollars at the time. This would be more than six billion US dollars by 2015 standards. In 1971 SCLB losses had basically disappeared. This was due to the return usage of normal cytoplasm corn, not as conducive weather, residues being buried, and planting early. The SCLB epidemic highlighted the issue of genetic uniformity in monoculture crops, which allows for a greater likelihood of new pathogen races and host vulnerability.

In the present day, there are many management methods and better education practices but the disease can still be an issue in tropical climates, causing devastating yield losses up to 70%.
