= Crops for the Future =

Crops For the Future
- Formation: 2009
- Type: International Partnership Organisation
- Legal status: International organisation
- Purpose: Promote and facilitate the use of neglected and underutilized crops
- Location: Malaysia
- Region served: Worldwide
- Global Coordinator: Dr Michael Hermann
- Website: www.cffresearch.org

Crops For the Future, known by its acronym CFF, is an independent international organisation with a mandate to promote and facilitate the greater use of neglected and underutilized crops for enhanced diversification of agricultural systems and human diets, particularly for the benefit of poor people in developing countries. Crops for the Future is the only such organisation exclusively dedicated to an agenda increasingly recognised as important to achieving food security in a sustainable manner and making use of local agricultural biodiversity. Crops for the Future is based in Semenyih, Malaysia, and is governed by a board of directors, including a representative of the Government of Malaysia.

== Mission ==
Working in partnership with CGIAR, GFAR, FAO and other international organizations and with a range of national and non-governmental institutions, Crops For the Future seeks to:

- increase the knowledge base for neglected crops,
- advocate policies that do not discriminate against crop diversity,
- increase awareness of the relevance of neglected crops for rural livelihoods, and
- strengthen capacities in relevant sectors.

== Research and development ==
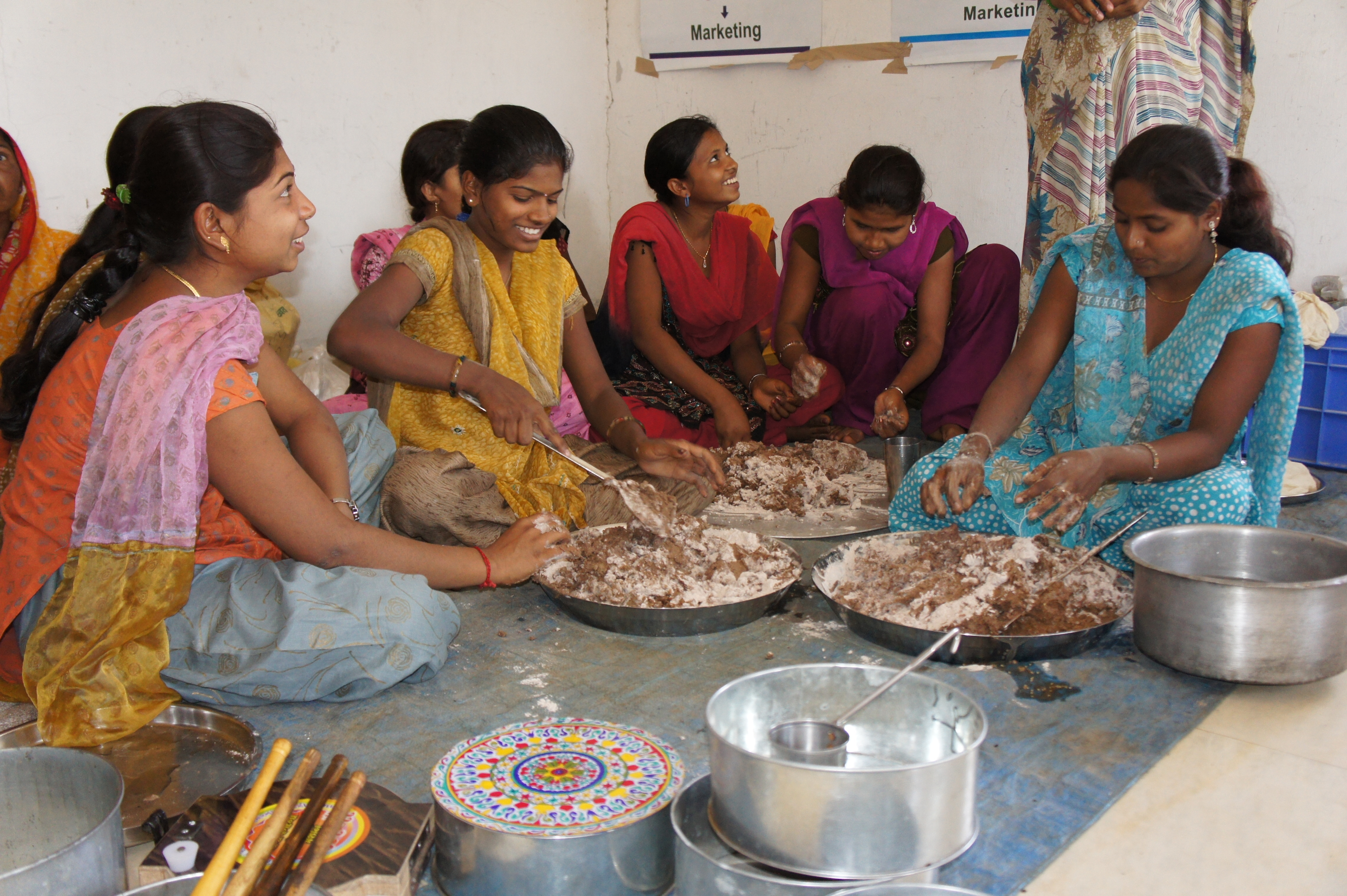
A self-help group of CoDI, India, preparing pappad from finger millet.

Crops for the Future convenes international science events focusing on underutilised species, notably a series of international symposia, such as the International Symposium on Underutilized Plants for Food Security, Nutrition, Income and Sustainable Development, in Arusha, 2008 and the Second International Symposium on Underutilised Plant Species, in Kuala Lumpur, 2011.

In collaboration with local partners, Crops for the Future also undertakes research and development projects in poor communities of developing countries designed to improve rural livelihoods through greater use of agricultural biodiversity.

Coalition to Diversify Income (CoDI) is one of the programmes led by Crops for the Future (through its predecessor – ICUC) and has been carried out in eight locations in India and Vietnam. CoDI is designed to assist small farmers to develop and implement better practice in crop production and post-harvest management, as well as to overcome the limitation of market access in order to generate more income. The case of Hòa Vang sticky rice in Hải Dương represents a good example of the success of this project. In India, CoDI promoted enhanced utilisation of minor millets, such as Eleusine coracana and native fruits in the states of Maharashtra and Gujarat.

The project "Recipes for Success" was implemented in local communities in Benin, Kenya and Tanzania, to enhance consumption and production of indigenous fruits and vegetables by local communities for more nutritious and sustainable diets.

== History ==
Crops For the Future was established in 2009 through the merger of the International Centre for Underutilised Crops (ICUC) in Sri Lanka and the Global Facilitation Unit for Underutilised Species (GFU) in Rome.

=== International Centre for Underutilised Crops ===
One of the predecessors of Crops For the Future, the International Centre for Underutilised Crops was an independent nonprofit scientific research institute that investigated, coordinated and supported research programmes towards increasing the productivity and use of what are termed underutilised crops—crops that have a potential to be cultivated and made useful on a significantly larger scale than they have been. The ICUC researched and promoted tropical, sub-tropical and temperate plants and plant-products, and operated in over 30 countries in a variety of partnership arrangements with international and local research groups, NGOs and private enterprises.

The centre was launched in 1989 at the University of Southampton in southern England, a concept arising out of the International Conference on New Crops for Food and Industry held in Southampton two years previously. The founding director was Dr. Nazmul Haq, an academic at Southampton's Civil Engineering and the Environment research school.

During the 1990s, the ICUC expanded and established networks in Asia, Southern and Eastern Africa, and secured research and development funding for several defined projects from sources such as the UK's Department for International Development. In 2001 the ICUC became a partner institution of the Consultative Group on International Agricultural Research (CGIAR), and continued to establish regional centres and cooperative partnerships with other research bodies and organisations.

In 2005, the ICUC moved its headquarters from Southampton to near Colombo in Sri Lanka, in a co-hosting arrangement with the International Water Management Institute (IWMI). Among other reasons, the move sought to better align the ICUC's research activities and consultative expertise with similarly themed programmes operating in the "Global South". The move saw a change in directorship, with plant physiologist Dr. Hannah Jaenicke assuming the role.

In 2009, ICUC and the Global Facilitation Unit for Underutilised Species (GFU) merged to become "Crops for the Future" (CFF), a new organisation that combines the former mandates of its predecessor organisations, and engages in partnerships building on the networks established by ICUC and GFU.

== See also ==
- Agricultural biodiversity
