= ProMusa =

International research organization

- Established: 1997
- Dissolved: 2021
- Parent organization: INIBAP (1997–2006) and Bioversity International (2007–2021)
- Website: promusa.org

ProMusa was the name originally given to a global program on banana improvement set up by INIBAP in 1997. In 2007, it was restructured as a knowledge-sharing platform coordinated by Bioversity International. It was dissolved in 2021.

== History ==
Promusa was created in 1997 by the World Bank and INIBAP as a global program to co-ordinate and improve research on banana improvement. Its aim was to increase interactions between pathologists and the world’s few banana breeders in order to maximize the outputs of breeding and accelerate the impact of banana improvement efforts.

At the start, the program had five interlinked thematic working groups (Genetic Improvement, Fusarium wilt, Sigatoka diseases, Nematodes and Viruses), coordinated by a secretariat which was provided by INIBAP. It was directed by a steering committee and operated under a program support group composed of major donors and stakeholders.

In 2007, after INIBAP and IPGRI jointly adopted the name Bioversity International, membership was opened to anyone interested in banana and the program was reorganized into three working groups (Crop Production, Crop Protection and Crop Improvement). ProMusa also provided the basic structure for the Section on Banana (which later became the Banana Commission) of the International Society for Horticultural Science (ISHS).

ProMusa was dissolved in 2021.

== Organizational structure ==
ProMusa was overseen by a steering committee and Bioversity International provided the Secretariat.

== Main activities ==
The Secretariat oversaw the development of a website aimed at improving the understanding of banana. Its main sections were a compendium of knowledge on banana (Musapedia), and a collection of news and blogs (InfoMus@). ProMusa also managed three databases: a repository of references on banana (Musalit); an image bank on banana (Musarama), and a contacts database (Musacontacts).

Between 2007 and 2018, ProMusa organized scientific symposia in alliance with the ISHS.
