= Bioversity International =

International research organization

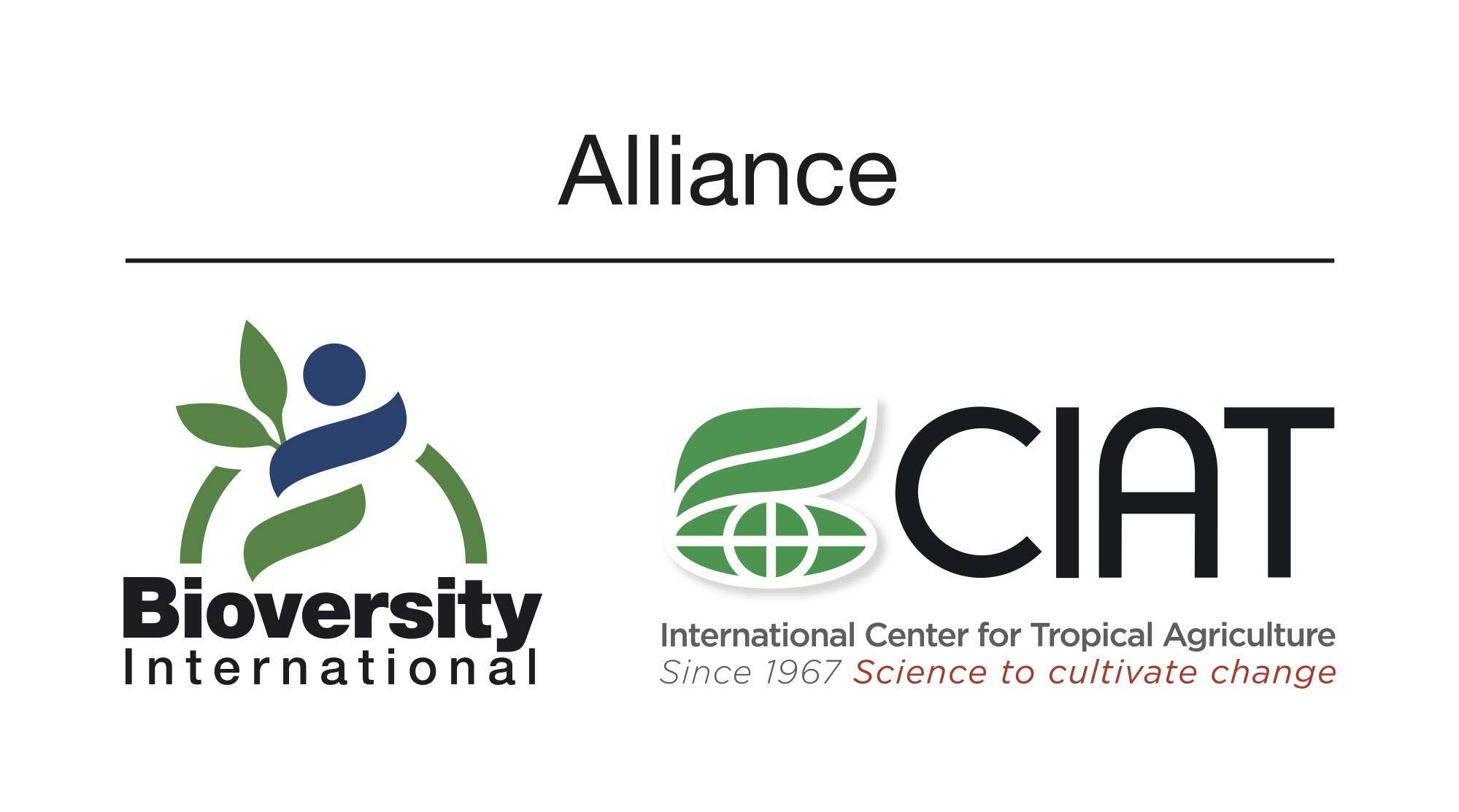
- Merged into: The Alliance of Bioversity International and CIAT
- Formation: 1974
- Type: Global non-profit research-for-development organization
- Legal status: International organization
- Purpose: Research for development
- Headquarters: Rome
- Location: Italy
- Region served: 18 offices worldwide
- Director General: Juan Lucas Restrepo
- Staff: Around 300
- Website: alliancebioversityciat.org

Bioversity International is a global research-for-development organization that delivers scientific evidence, management practices and policy options to use and safeguard agricultural biodiversity to attain global food- and nutrition security, working with partners in low-income countries in different regions where agricultural biodiversity can contribute to improved nutrition, resilience, productivity and climate change adaptation. In 2019, Bioversity International joined with the International Center for Tropical Agriculture (as the Alliance of Bioversity International and CIAT) to "deliver research-based solutions that harness agricultural biodiversity and sustainably transform food systems to improve people's lives". Both institutions are members of the CGIAR, a global research partnership for a food-secure future.

The organization is highly decentralized, with about 300 staff working around the world with regional offices located in Central and South America, West and Central Africa, East and Southern Africa, Central and South Asia, and South-east Asia. In the summer of 2021 Bioversity International's office in Maccarese was moved to the Aventine Hill near the FAO in Rome, Italy and serves as the Alliance of Bioversity International and CIAT's global headquarters.

== Background ==
Bioversity International is a research-for-development organization focused on safeguarding and using agricultural biodiversity to help meet challenges such as adaptation to climate change and increased sustainable production.

The organization takes the view that diversity offers opportunities not only through breeding (of plants and of animals) but also by delivering many other benefits. Some are direct, such as the better nutrition and greater sustainability that come with locally adapted crops. Others are indirect, like the ecosystem services delivered by healthy populations of pollinators, biological control agents, and soil microbes. Agricultural biodiversity will also be absolutely essential to cope with the predicted impacts of climate change, not simply as a source of traits but as the underpinnings of more resilient farm ecosystems.

== Governance ==
Bioversity International is governed by a Board of Trustees, including one Trustee nominated by the host country (Italy) and one nominated by FAO. The Board also appoints the Director General who manages the operation of the various programs. The current Director General is Juan Lucas Restrepo.

== History ==
In 2014, Bioversity International marked 40 years of operations. Bioversity International was originally established by the CGIAR as the International Board for Plant Genetic Resources (IBPGR) in 1974. In October 1993, IBPGR became the International Plant Genetic Resources Institute (IPGRI) and in 1994 IPGRI began independent operation as one of the centers of the CGIAR. At the request of the CGIAR, in 1994 IPGRI took over the governance and administration of the International Network for the Improvement of Banana and Plantain (INIBAP). In 2006, IPGRI and INIBAP became a single organization and subsequently changed their operating name to Bioversity International. Bioversity International still maintains the world's largest banana gene bank, the Bioversity International Musa Germplasm Transit Centre, that is hosted at the Katholieke Universiteit Leuven (KU Leuven) in Leuven, Belgium, and manages ProMusa - a platform that shares knowledge about bananas and plantains. In 2002, the Global Crop Diversity Trust was established by Bioversity International on behalf of the CGIAR and the UN Food and Agriculture Organization, through a Crop Diversity Endowment Fund.

== Publications ==
Bioversity International and its predecessors have published occasional papers under the title Issues in Genetic Resources. In 2017, the organization published Mainstreaming Agrobiodiversity In Sustainable Food Systems - Scientific Foundations for an Agrobiodiversity Index, a book that put the spotlight on the importance of agrobiodiversity as the foundation of our food supplies.

== Notable former member Board of Trustees ==
- Prof. Emeritus Chin Hoong Fong, IBGR (1987-1992), Honorary Fellow (1997-2018)
