= Food contaminant =

Harmful substance in food

A food contaminant is a harmful chemical or microorganism present in food, which can cause illness to the consumer.

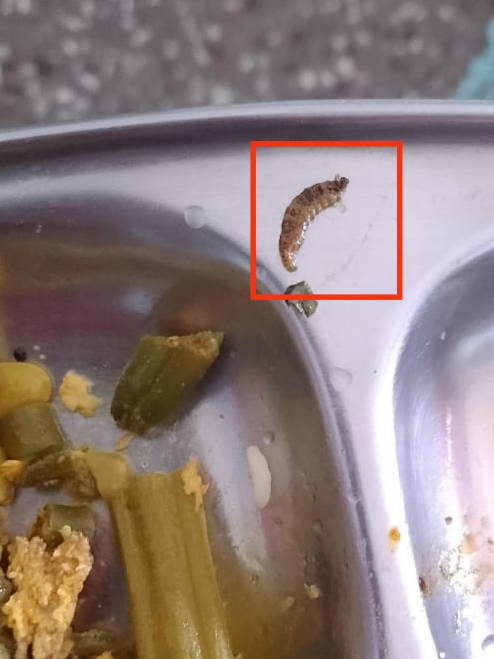
Contaminated food

The impact of chemical contaminants on consumer health and well-being is often apparent only after many years of processing and prolonged exposure at low levels (e.g., cancer). Unlike food-borne pathogens, chemical contaminants present in foods are often unaffected by thermal processing. Chemical contaminants can be classified according to the source of contamination and the mechanism by which they enter the food product.

== Agrochemicals ==
Agrochemicals are chemicals used in agricultural practices and animal husbandry with the intent to increase crop yields. Such agents include pesticides (e.g., insecticides, herbicides, rodenticides), plant growth regulators, veterinary drugs (e.g., nitrofuran, fluoroquinolones, malachite green, chloramphenicol), and bovine somatotropin (rBST).

== Environmental contaminants ==
Environmental contaminants are chemicals that are present in the environment in which the food is grown, harvested, transported, stored, packaged, processed, and consumed. The physical contact of the food with its environment results in its contamination. Possible sources of contamination and contaminants common to that vector include:

- Air: radionuclides (caesium-137, strontium-90), polycyclic aromatic hydrocarbons (PAH)
- Water: arsenic, mercury
- Soil: cadmium, nitrates, perchlorates
- Packaging materials: antimony, tin, lead, perfluorooctanoic acid (PFOA), semicarbazide, benzophenone, isopropylthioxanthone (ITX), bisphenol A
- Processing/cooking equipment: copper or other metal chips, lubricants, cleaning and sanitizing agents
- Naturally occurring toxins: mycotoxins, phytohemagglutinin, pyrrolizidine alkaloids, grayanotoxin, scombrotoxin (histamine), ciguatera, shellfish toxins (see shellfish poisoning), tetrodotoxin, among many others.

== Pesticides and carcinogens ==
There are many cases of banned pesticides or carcinogens found in foods.

- Greenpeace exposed in 2006 that 25% of surveyed supermarkets in China stocked agricultural products contaminated with banned pesticides. Over 70% of tomatoes that tested were found to have the banned pesticide Lindane, and almost 40% of the samples had a mix of three or more types of pesticides. Tangerine, strawberry, and Kyofung grape samples were also found contaminated by banned pesticides, including the highly toxic methamidophos. Greenpeace says there exists no comprehensive monitoring on fruit produce in the Hong Kong as of 2006.
- In India, soft drinks were found contaminated with high levels of pesticides and insecticides, including lindane, DDT, malathion and chlorpyrifos.
- Formaldehyde, a carcinogen, was frequently found in the common Vietnamese dish, Pho, resulting in the 2007 Vietnam food scare. "Health agencies have known that Vietnamese soy sauce, the country's second most popular sauce after fish sauce, has been chock full of cancer agents since at least 2001", reported the Thanh Nien daily. "Why didn't anyone tell us?" The carcinogen in Asian sauces is 3-MCPD and its metabolite 1,3-DCP, which has been an ongoing problem affecting multiple continents. Vietnamese vegetables and fruits were also found to have banned pesticides.
- The 2005 Indonesia food scare, where carcinogenic formaldehyde was found to be added as a preservative to noodles, tofu, salted fish, and meatballs.
- In 2008 Chinese milk scandal, melamine was discovered to have been added to milk and infant formula which caused 54,000 babies to be sent to the hospital. Six babies died because of kidney stones related to the contaminant.

== Hair in food ==
There is a heavy stigma attached to the presence of hair in food in most societies. There is a risk that it may induce choking and vomiting, and also that it may be contaminated by toxic substances. Views differ as to the level of risk it poses to the inadvertent consumer.

In most countries, people working in the food industry are required to cover their hair because it will contaminate the food. When people are served food which contains hair in restaurants or cafés, it is usual for them to complain to the staff.

There are a range of possible reasons for the objection to hair in food, ranging from cultural taboos to the simple fact that it is difficult to digest and unpleasant to eat. It may also be interpreted as a sign of more widespread problems with hygiene. The introduction of complete-capture hairnets is believed to have resulted in a decrease in incidents of contamination of this type.

Sometimes protein from human hair is used as a food ingredient, in bread and other such similar products. Such use of human hair in food is forbidden in Islam. Historically, in Judaism, finding hair in food was a sign of bad luck.

== Processing contaminants ==
Processing contaminants are generated during the processing of foods (e.g., heating, fermentation). They are absent in the raw materials, and are formed by chemical reactions between natural and/or added food constituents during processing. The presence of these contaminants in processed foods cannot be entirely avoided. Technological processes can be adjusted and/or optimized, however, in order to reduce the levels of formation of processing contaminants. Examples are: nitrosamines, polycyclic aromatic hydrocarbons (PAH), heterocyclic amines, histamine, acrylamide, furan, benzene, trans fat, 3-MCPD, semicarbazide, 4-hydroxynonenal (4-HNE), and ethyl carbamate. There is also the possibility of metal chips from the processing equipment contaminating food. These can be identified using metal detection equipment. In many conveyor lines, the line will be stopped, or when weighing the product with a Check weigher, the item can be rejected for being over- or underweight or because small pieces of metal are detected within it.

== Emerging food contaminants ==
While many food contaminants have been known for decades, the formation and presence of certain chemicals in foods has been discovered relatively recently. These are the so-called emerging food contaminants like acrylamide, furan, benzene, perchlorate, perfluorooctanoic acid (PFOA), 3-monochloropropane-1,3-diol (3-MCPD), 4-hydroxynonenal, and (4-HNE).

Microplastics are often found in bottled water. Polypropylene infant feeding bottles cause microplastics exposure to infants.

== Safety and regulation ==
Acceptable daily intake (ADI) levels and tolerable concentrations of contaminants in individual foods are determined on the basis of the "No Observed Adverse Effect Level" (NOAEL) in animal experiments, by using a safety factor (usually 100). The maximum concentrations of contaminants allowed by legislation are often well below toxicological tolerance levels, because such levels can often be reasonably achieved by using good agricultural and manufacturing practices.

Regulatory officials, in order to combat the dangers associated with foodborne viruses, are pursuing various possible measures.

- The EFSA published a report in 2011 on "scientific opinion regarding an update of the present knowledge on the occurrence and control of foodborne viruses".
- This year, an expert working group created by the European Committee for Standardization (CEN), is expected to publish a standard method for the detection of norovirus and hepatitis A virus in food.
- The CODEX Committee on Food Hygiene (CCFH) is also working on a guideline which is now ready for final adoption.
- European Commission Regulation (EC) No 2073/2005 of 15 November 2005 indicates that "foodstuffs should not contain micro-organisms or their toxins or metabolites in quantities that present an unacceptable risk for human health", underlining that methods are required for foodborne virus detection.

== Food contaminant testing ==
To maintain the high quality of food and comply with health, safety, and environmental regulatory standards, it is best to rely on food contaminant testing through an independent third party, such as laboratories or certification companies. For manufacturers, the testing for food contaminants can minimize the risk of noncompliance in relation to raw ingredients, semi-manufactured foods, and final products. Also, food contaminant testing assures consumers safety and quality of purchased food products and can prevent foodborne diseases, and chemical, microbiological, or physical food hazards.

The establishment of ADIs for certain emerging food contaminants is currently an active area of research and regulatory debate.

== Food contaminant detection method ==
The conventional food contaminant test methods may be limited by complicated/tedious sample preparing procedure, long testing time, sumptuous instrument, and professional operator. However, some rapid, novel, sensitive, and easy to use and affordable methods were developed including:

- Cyanidin quantification by naphthalimide-based azo dye colorimetric probe
- Lead quantification by modified immunoassay test strip based on a heterogeneously sized gold amplified probe
- Microbial toxin by HPLC with UV-Vis or fluorescence detection and competitive immunoassays with ELISA configuration
- Bacterial virulence genes detection reverse-transcription polymerase chain reaction (RT-PCR) and DNA colony hybridization
- Pesticide detection and quantification by strip-based immunoassay, a test strip based on functionalized AuNPs, and test strip, surface-enhanced raman spectroscopy (SERS)
- Enrofloxacin (chickens antibiotic) quantification by a Ru(phen)3 2+- doped silica fluorescent nanoparticle (NP) based immunochromatographic test strip and a portable fluorescent strip reader
- Nitrite quantification by The PRhB-based electrochemical sensors and Ion selective electrodes (ISEs)

== See also ==
- Bad Bug Book from the U.S. Food and Drug Administration
- The Joint FAO/WHO Expert Committee Report on Food Additives
- List of food contamination incidents
