= MCPD =

MCPD may refer to:

- 2-MCPD and 3-MCPD, toxic by-products of acid-hydrolyzed fats
- Maui County Police Department
- Microsoft Certified Professional Developer
- Montgomery County Police Department, the primary law enforcement agency for Montgomery County, Maryland
- Multi-Crop Passport Descriptor, an international standard to facilitate germplasm passport information exchange
- Mixopolis City Police Department, the police tribe from the TV series Mixels
