= C3H7ClO2 =

The molecular formula C_{3}H_{7}ClO_{2} (molar mass: 108.52 g/mol) may refer to:

- 2-MCPD
- 3-MCPD
