= 2005 Indonesia food scare =

Food contamination event in Indonesia

The 2005 Indonesia food scare was a food scare in 2005 in Jakarta, Indonesia, when the government found that 60% of noodle shops in the capital had been serving noodles laced with formaldehyde, a known carcinogen. Police raids were immediately launched to shut down the large suppliers to spread awareness of the consequences faced by formaldehyde offenders that included large fines and a maximum 15-year jail term, if found guilty. Noodles in the 2007 Vietnam food scare also had the same contaminant, and the chemical preservative had also definitely been found on tofu, noodles, and salted fish. Thailand has similar formaldehyde problems. Rumors spread that it was used on chicken as well.

== See also ==
- Food contamination
- 2008 Chinese milk scandal
