= Chloropropanol =

Chloropropanols are chlorohydrins related to propanols containing chloride functional group. Eight isomers are possible. Two of these derivatives, 1,3-dichloropropanol (1,3-DCP) and 3-chloropropane-1,2-diol (3-MCPD), are carcinogenic contaminants in processed foods. Several isomers are encountered in industrial chemistry.

Monochloropropanols:

- 2-Chloro-1-propanol
- 3-Chloro-1-propanol
- 1-Chloro-2-propanol

Dichloropropanols:

- 1,2-Dichloropropanol
- 1,3-Dichloropropanol (1,3-DCP)

Chloropropanediols:

- 3-Chloropropane-1,2-diol (3-MCPD)
- 2-Chloropropane-1,3-diol (2-MCPD)
