= Gene bank =

Facility that preserves genetic material

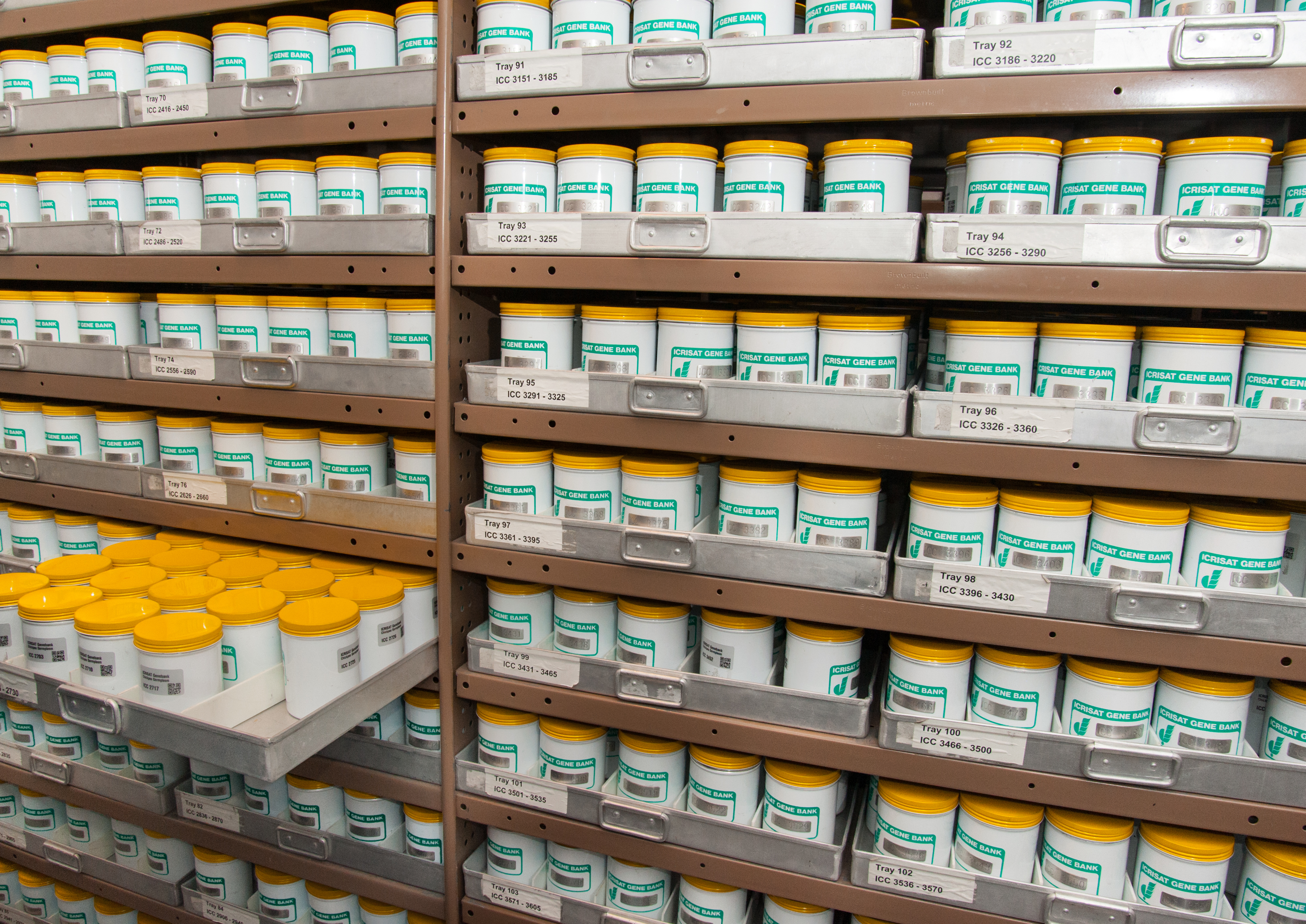
The active gene bank of the International Crops Research Institute for the Semi-Arid Tropics in Patancheru, India.

A gene bank is a type of biorepository that is used across the world to store the genetic material of animals, plants, and other organisms. It preserves their genetic information in the form of reproductive material like seeds, sperm, eggs, embryos, cells and other kinds of DNA. Oftentimes, these banks house the genetic material of species that are endangered or close to extinction. They are also used for the preservation of major crop species and cultivars, in order to preserve crop diversity. This protects the organism from threats like extinction, diseases, and climate change.

== Preservation methods ==
Preservation is done via the collection and storage of reproductive material from an organism. For example, seeds and cuttings may be collected from plants, spores may be collected from fungi, and sperm and egg cells may be collected from animals. Pollen is also an essential component for the reproduction of seed plants. It contains the male genetic material for fertilization of other plants and is stored through cryopreservation. Aquatic organisms, such as coral, are preserved via the collection of fragments that are sustained alive in a carefully controlled aquatic environment.

The collected material is oftentimes stored at a temperature below 0 °C (32 °F). It may also be stored in cryogenic conditions using liquid nitrogen. Certain gene banks, called Field gene banks, are based around the continuous cultivation of living organisms, such as certain species of plants being raised in a controlled nutrient medium, or artificially created habitats that then harbor certain species.

The database of the largest gene banks in the world can be queried via a common website, Genesys. A number of global gene banks are coordinated by the CGIAR Genebank Platform.

== Types of gene banks ==
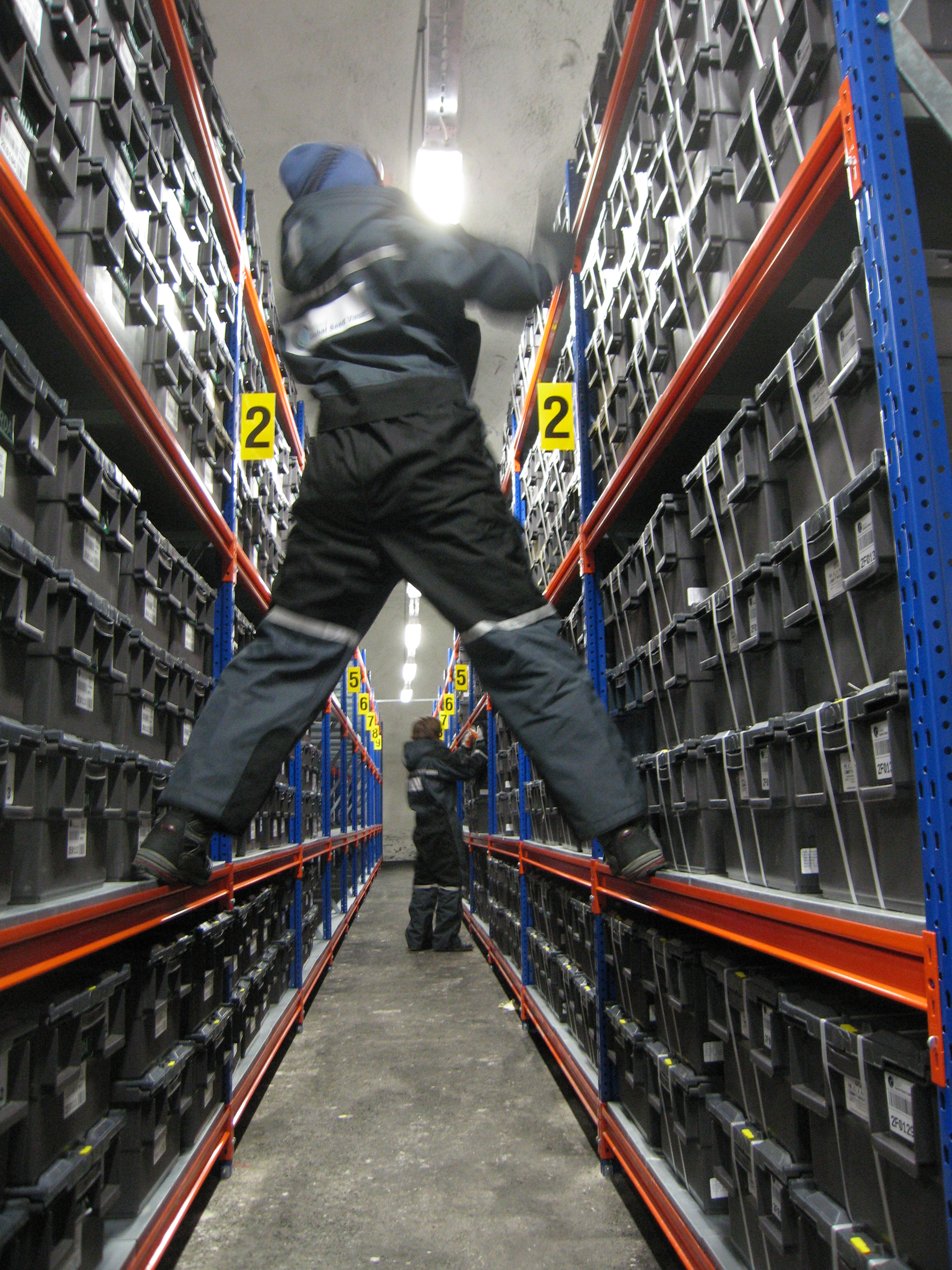
Inside Svalbard Global Seed Vault

=== Seed bank ===
Seed banks, also known as seed vaults, are large repositories where many different species of seeds are stored at freezing temperatures. They are used to preserve the genetic diversity for possible future uses. The temperature that the seeds are stored at depends on the type of seed and the length of the preservation. Short-term storage refers to seeds that are stored anywhere from 3–5 years and are typically stored at temperatures of 5 to 10 °C (41 to 50 °F). Medium term storage refers to seeds stored from 10 to 15 years and are typically stored at a temperature of 0 °C (32 °F). Seeds that are in long-term storage have been stored for 50+ years and are typically at a temperature of −18 to −20 °C (0 to −4 °F). It is also important that when seeds are stored, the moisture content of the seeds and the surrounding medium is kept low, otherwise the seeds will not be viable after long periods in freezing temperatures. The largest seed bank in the world is the Millennium Seed Bank housed at the Wellcome Trust Millennium Building (WTMB), located on the grounds of Wakehurst Place in West Sussex, near London.

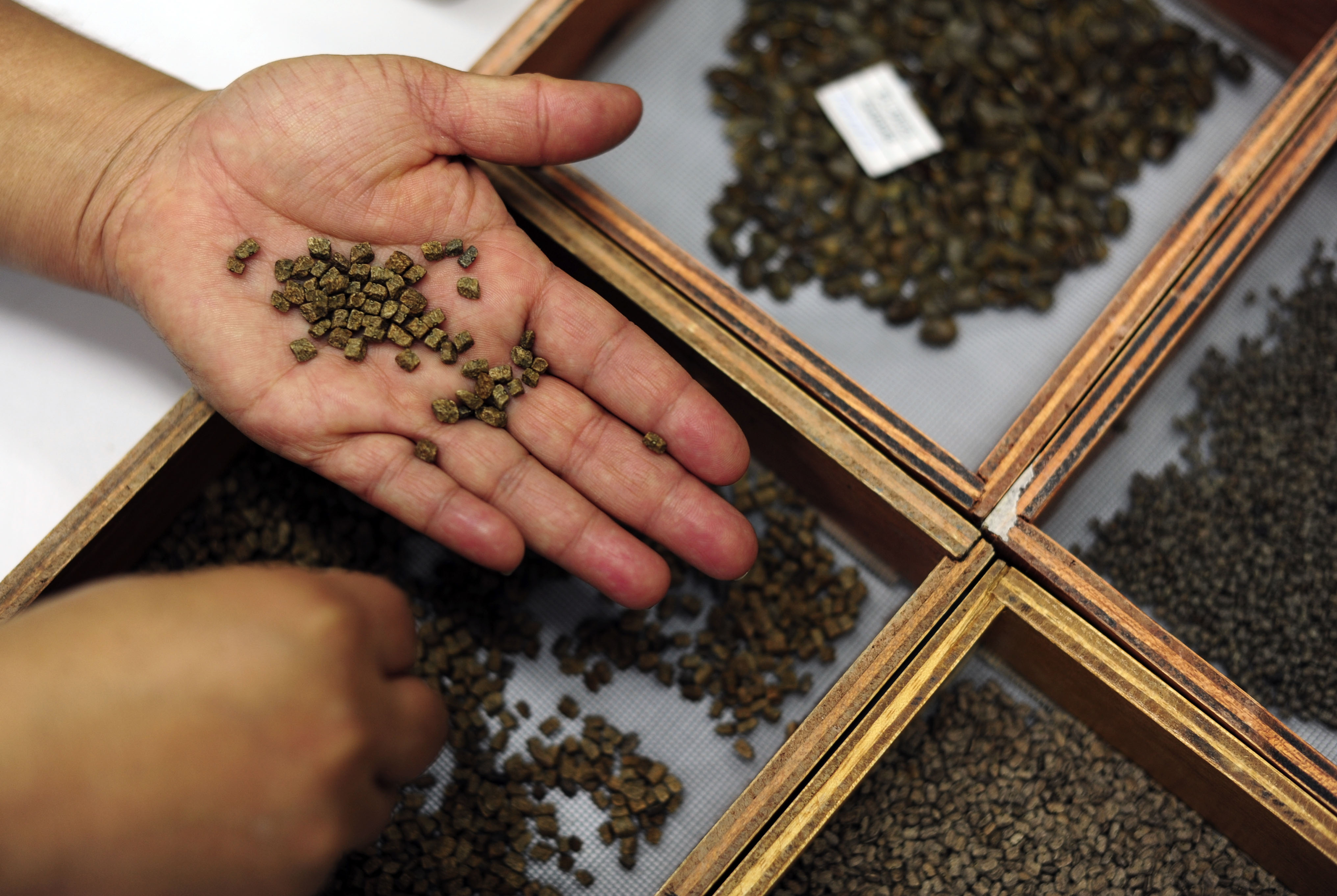
Beans stored at a seed vault

=== In-Vitro bank ===
An in vitro bank is another type of gene bank that stores plant or animal genetic material. It is a controlled, lab-based environment and not a traditional vault with dry or cytogenetic conditions similar to those seen in seed banks. In-vitro banks are responsible for storing genetic material like plant cells, embryos, and tissues. The samples are usually preserved in a nutrient medium, such as a test tube or culture dish. For example, buds, protocorm and meristematic cells are preserved through particular light and temperature arrangements in a nutrient medium, which is either a gel or in liquid form. This technique is used to preserve seedless plants and plants that reproduce asexually or require preservation as clones such as commercial cultivars. Oftentimes, these specimens require specific conditions for growth, so this bank is useful for preserving living tissues in a controlled and artificially supported environment.

=== Cryobank ===
In a cryobank, biological material such as sperm (in a sperm bank), eggs, and embryos, are preserved at very low temperatures. It is usually preserved in liquid nitrogen at a temperature of −196 °C (−320.8 °F). By freezing the seeds or embryos at this temperature, they can stay viable for at least a century. Cryobanks are often utilized for the Cryoconservation of animal genetic resources. These types of gene banks are helpful for the conservation of species facing extinction. An example of one of the largest animal cryobanks in the world is the Frozen zoo made by the San Diego Zoo, in San Diego California. The Frozen Zoo's collection contains over 10,000 living cells, oocytes, embryos, and other genetic material from thousands of species, including one extinct species. With animal cryobanks, freezing embryos is the preferred method instead of separating the egg and sperm because they are more resistant to the freezing process.

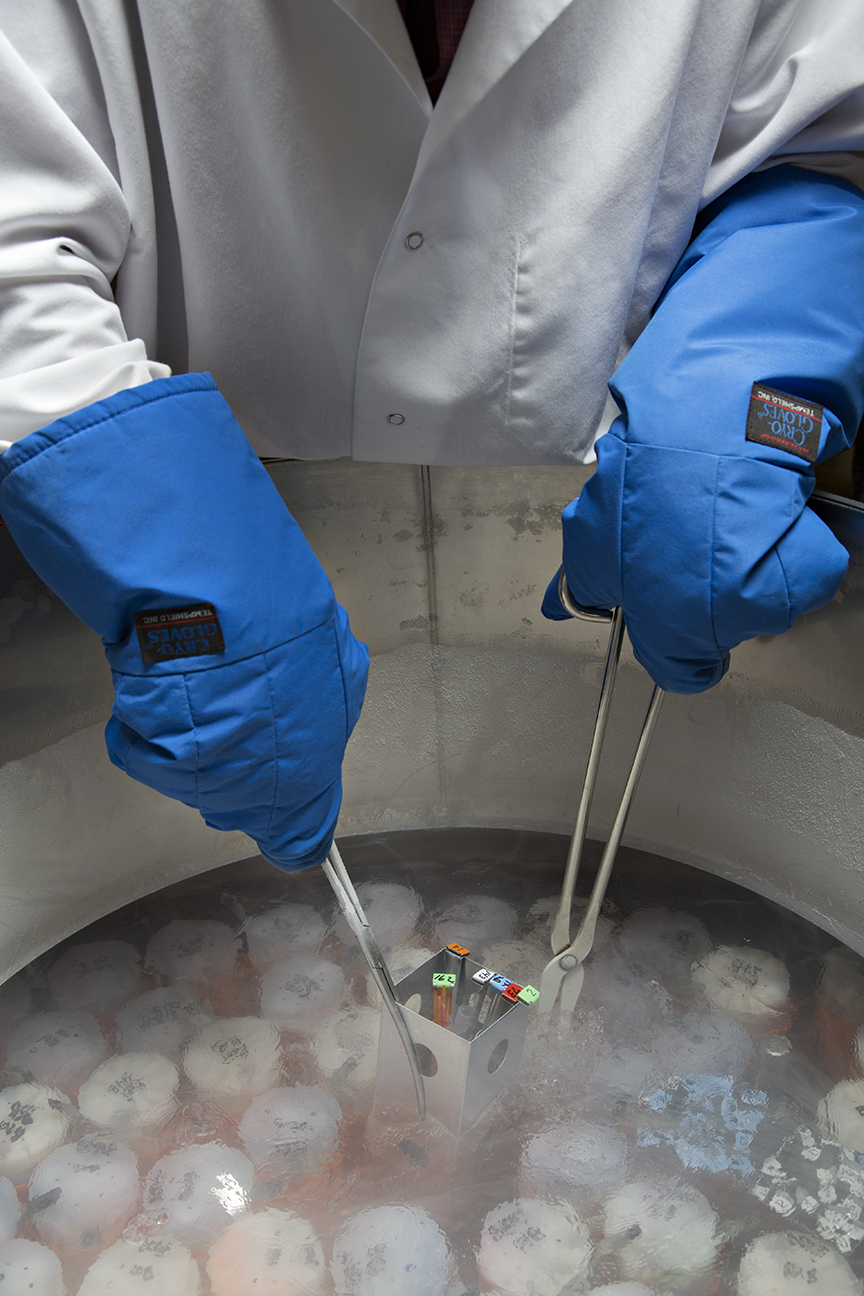
USDA cryopreservation gene bank

=== Storage of pollen ===
Pollen is stored through a cryopreservation technique called vitrification. Vitrification, in this context, is based around the freezing of pollen grains without the formation of ice crystals that would heavily damage the pollen. The pollen, which is stored in liquid nitrogen, is kept at temperatures of −180 to −196 °C (−292.0 to −320.8 °F). The National Seed Storage Lab in Fort Collins, Colorado currently uses this technique to store pollen. Pollen can also be freeze dried and stored at temperatures of 5 to −18 °C (41 to 0 °F). An important element that must be considered is the levels of moisture in the pollen. If the pollen grains have a low moisture content it helps increase the length of the pollen's life. Low levels of moisture help the pollen freeze without creating ice or ice crystals, which helps preserve the life span of the pollen while it is being stored. Ideal levels of moisture content to be allowed in the pollen depends on the type of plant. The pollen from different plant species can be divided into two groups. One is binucleate pollen, which has a thicker exine and the second is trinucleate pollen, which has a thinner exine. Binucleate pollen has a higher lifespan when frozen at a low moisture level. Trinucleate pollen, however, has a higher lifespan when frozen at a high moisture level. Moisture level in the pollen can be decreased by exposing the pollen to diluted salt solutions, silica gel and dry air or by chemical treatment with vitrification solutions.

=== Field gene banks ===
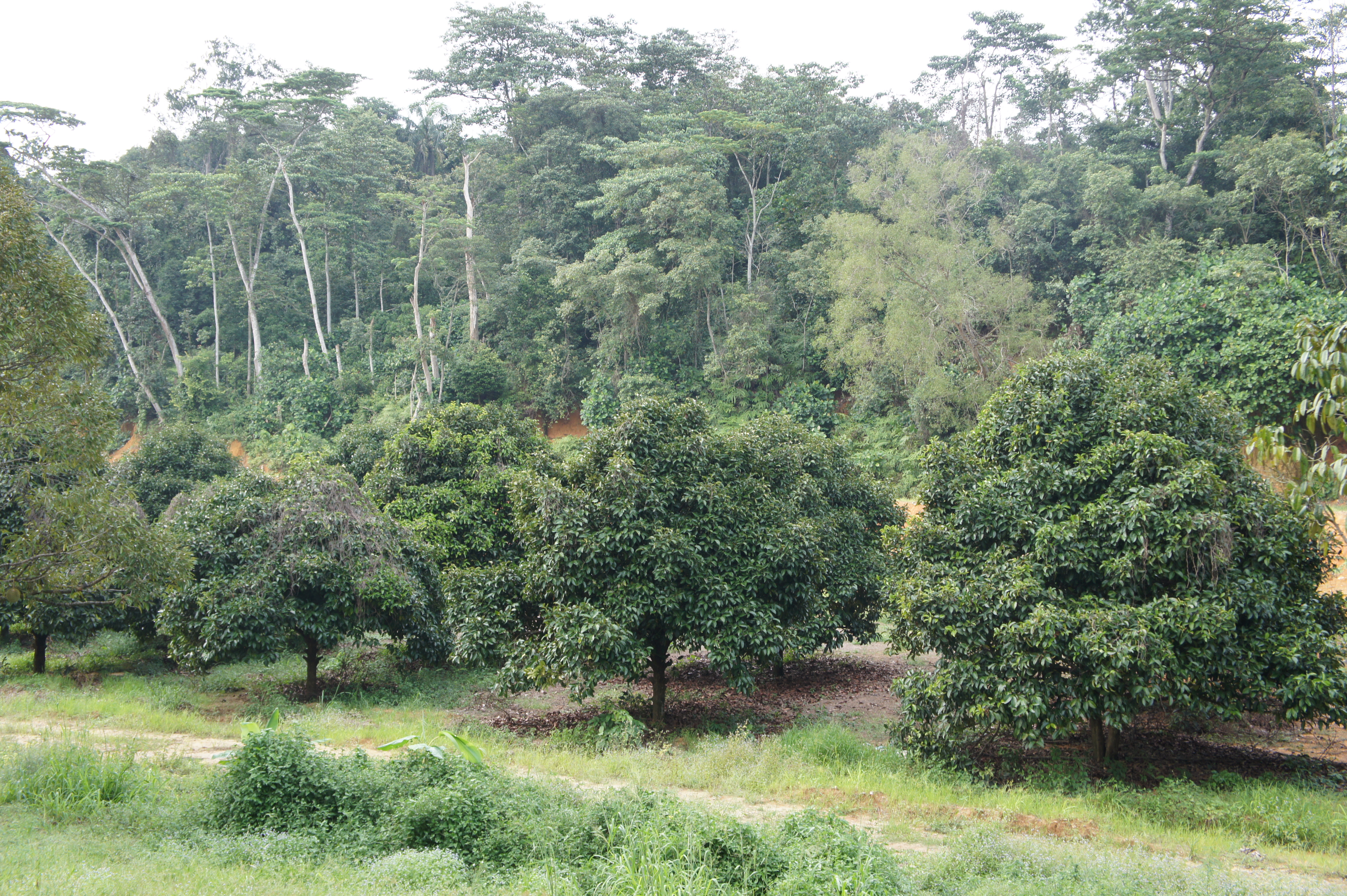
Field gene bank in Malaysia

Field gene banks are gene banks based around the management of live specimens, such as fruit trees and other plants, that require specific conditions to grow. In contrast to a seed bank, a Field gene bank focuses on the facilitation of backups of germplasm, typically in the form of seeds. Field gene banks are vulnerable to natural disasters, pests and disease. As such, they are typically used as a method of last resort if a species cannot be preserved via normal means, such as if it didn't produce seeds. This method also uses more land, energy and water than other methods, thus making it a less ideal option.

An example of a Field gene bank includes the International Rice Research Institute (IRRI) located in the Philippines. This organization contributes to the preservation of thousands of rice species by maintaining Field gene banks of the rice varieties. These rice species often have special traits such as the resistance to pests, disease, and drought. Each variety is important for the future development of new and more resilient species to address challenges around food security in countries with higher poverty and hunger concerns.

=== Animal genetic resource bank ===
In an Animal Genetic Resource bank, genetic material is stored to ensure the long term preservation and accessibility of it for possible future uses. The DNA inhabited here comes from a variety of different animal species that range from livestock and poultry to other organisms like insects and aquatic animals. More specifically, eggs, embryos, sperm, and other tissues are stored at very low temperatures using the advanced techniques of cryopreservation. These banks are crucial for guarding the genetic diversity of these populations, which is essential for the long term survival and adaptability of these populations.

These facilities are particularly important for conserving genetic material from endangered species to support breeding programs that aim to save them. For species that risk extinction, the DNA in these banks provide a form of genetic insurance. It allows for the possibility of bringing back genetic diversity to the species if need be. Genetic material can be used to reintroduce diversity to a wild population who faces threats, such as genetic drift or inbreeding. In a situation where an animal cannot reproduce naturally due to disease or environmental changes, the genetic material can be used to assist the populations natural reproductive efforts via genetic rescue. This type of preservation allows for a wide range of management strategies for future interventions.

== Facilities ==
- The Centre for Pacific Crops and Trees (CePaCT) plant gene bank in Suva, Fiji, focuses on propagating (and re-propagating) seedlings of plants (using clippings and tissue culture, rather than as seeds), to preserve the genetic diversity of the most important varieties of food crops of the Pacific region, such as banana, taro, breadfruit and yam.
- Gene banks are present all over the world, with differing objectives and resources. One of the largest is the Svalbard Global Seed Vault.

== Management Systems ==
- The Federal Ex situ gene bank is another example of one of the largest germplasm collections. It is established to collect, conserve, and characterize plant genetic resources to promote conservation. The Federal Ex situ gene bank also conducts relevant research to develop new techniques for resource conservation.
- In context of the United States, the Federal Ex situ gene bank includes facilities managed by government agencies such as the U.S. Department of Agriculture (USDA). The USDA helps to maintain a variety of gene banks like the National Plant Germplasm System (NPGS). The NPGS serves to store genetic resources for crops and wild plants, thus providing a backup against the loss of biodiversity as well an option for breeding programs and research.

== See also ==
- Sperm bank
- Ova bank
- Biobank
- Biological database
- Germplasm
- Seed bank
- Plant genetic resources
- Multi-Crop Passport Descriptor (MCPD)
