= Soy sauce =

East Asian liquid condiment

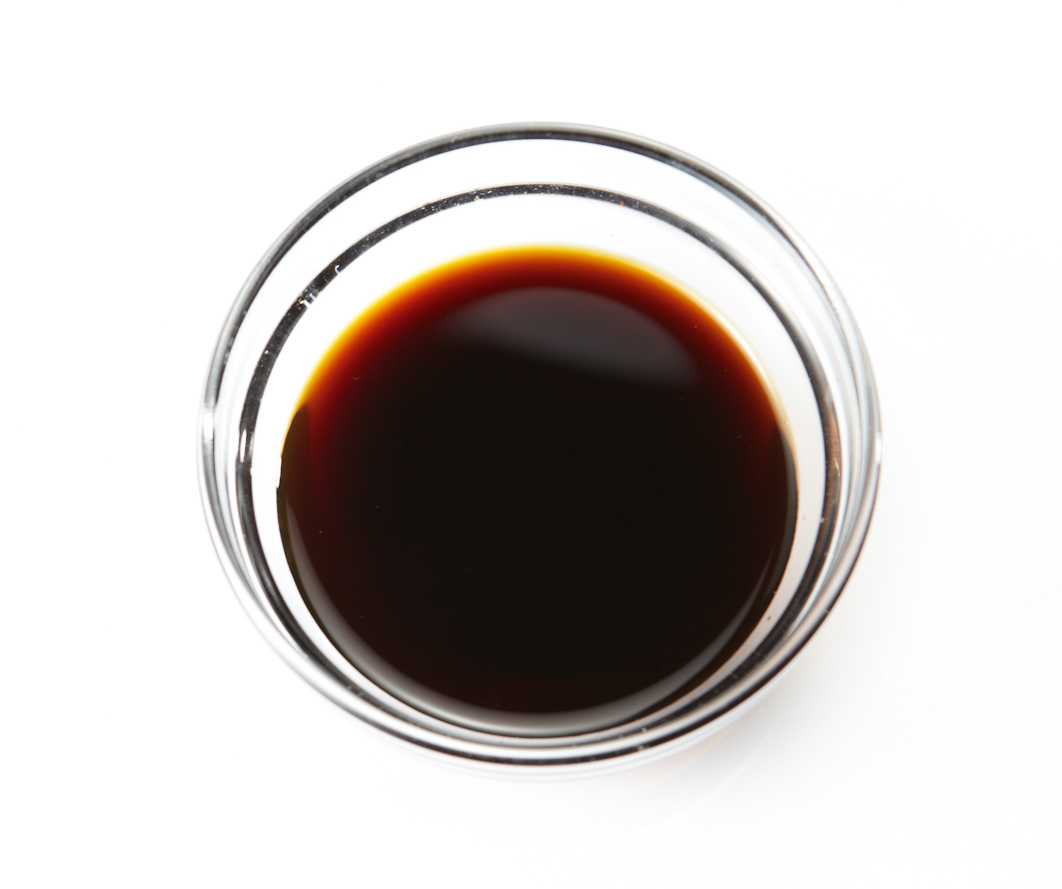
- A bowl of soy sauce
- Alternative names: Shoyu, jiàngyóu, soya sauce
- Type: Condiment
- Place of origin: China
- Region or state: East Asia and Southeast Asia
- Main ingredients: Soybeans

Soy sauce (sometimes called soya sauce in British English) is a liquid condiment of Chinese origin, traditionally made from a fermented paste of soybeans, roasted grain, brine, and Aspergillus oryzae or Aspergillus sojae molds (kōji). It is recognized for its saltiness and pronounced umami taste.

Soy sauce was created in its current form about 2,200 years ago during the Western Han dynasty of ancient China. Since then, it has become an important ingredient in East and Southeast Asian cooking as well as a condiment worldwide.

== Use and storage ==
Soy sauce may be added directly to food and is commonly used as a dipping sauce or used as seasoning in cooking. It is often eaten with rice, noodles, sushi, or sashimi, or mixed with ground wasabi for dipping. Bottles of soy sauce for the purpose of seasoning dishes are common on restaurant tables in many countries. Soy sauce is indefinitely shelf-stable.

== History ==
=== Asia ===
==== China ====
Soy sauce

Chinese name
- Traditional Chinese: 醬油 / 豆油 / 豉油
- Simplified Chinese: 酱油 / 豆油 / 豉油
- Literal meaning: "sauce oil" / "bean oil" / "fermented bean oil"
Transcriptions
Standard Mandarin
- Hanyu Pinyin: jiàng yóu
- Bopomofo: ㄐㄧㄤˋ ㄧㄡˊ
- Wade–Giles: chiang^{4}-yu^{2}
- IPA: [tɕjâŋ.jǒʊ]
other Mandarin
- Sichuanese Pinyin: dou^{4} you^{2}
Yue: Cantonese
- Yale Romanization: sih yàuh
- Jyutping: si6 jau4
- IPA: [si˨ jɐw˩]
Southern Min
- Hokkien POJ: tāu-iû
- Teochew Peng'im: si^{7} iu^{5}
Eastern Min
- Fuzhou BUC: siê-iù

Burmese name
- Burmese: ပဲငံပြာရည်
- IPA: [pɛ́ ŋàɰ̃ bjà jè]

Vietnamese name
- Vietnamese alphabet: xì dầu / nước tương / tàu vị yểu
- Chữ Nôm: 豉油 / 渃醬 / 豆味油

Thai name
- Thai: ซีอิ๊ว
- RTGS: si-io

Korean name
- Hangul: 간장
- Hanja: 간醬
- Literal meaning: "seasoning sauce"
Transcriptions
- Revised Romanization: ganjang
- McCune–Reischauer: kanjang

Japanese name
- Kanji: 醤油
- Hiragana: しょうゆ
Transcriptions
- Revised Hepburn: shōyu
- Kunrei-shiki: syôyu

Malay name
- Malay: kicap

Indonesian name
- Indonesian: kecap

Filipino name
- Tagalog: toyo

Lao name
- Lao: ເຕົ້າຈ້ຽວ (tao chiāu)

Khmer name
- Khmer: ស៊ីអ៊ីវ (sii 'iiv)

Soy sauce (醬油, jiàngyóu) is considered almost as old as soy paste—a type of fermented paste (jiàng, 醬) obtained from soybeans—which had appeared during the Western Han dynasty (206 BC – 220 AD) and was listed in the bamboo slips found in the archaeological site Mawangdui (馬王堆). There are several precursors of soy sauce that are associated products with soy paste. The oldest is qingjiang (清醬), which appeared in AD 40 and was listed in Simin Yueling (四民月令). Others are jiangqing (醬清), chizhi (豉汁) and chiqing (豉清), which were recorded in the Qimin Yaoshu (齊民要術) in AD 540. By the time of the Song dynasty (960–1279 AD), the term jiàng yóu (醬油) had become the accepted name for the liquid condiment, documented in two books: Shanjia Qinggong (山家清供) and Pujiang Wushi Zhongkuilu (浦江吳氏中饋錄) during the Song dynasty (960–1279 AD).

Like many salty condiments, soy sauce was originally a way to stretch salt, historically an expensive commodity. During the Zhou dynasty of ancient China, fermented fish with salt was used as a condiment in which soybeans were included during the fermentation process. By the time of the Han dynasty, this had been replaced with the recipe for soy paste and its by-product soy sauce, by using soybeans as the principal ingredient, with fermented fish-based sauces developing separately into fish sauce.

The 19th century Sinologist Samuel Wells Williams wrote that in China, the best soy sauce was "made by boiling beans soft, adding an equal quantity of wheat or barley, and leaving the mass to ferment; a portion of salt and three times as much water are afterwards put in, and the whole compound left for two or three months when the liquid is pressed and strained".

==== Japan ====
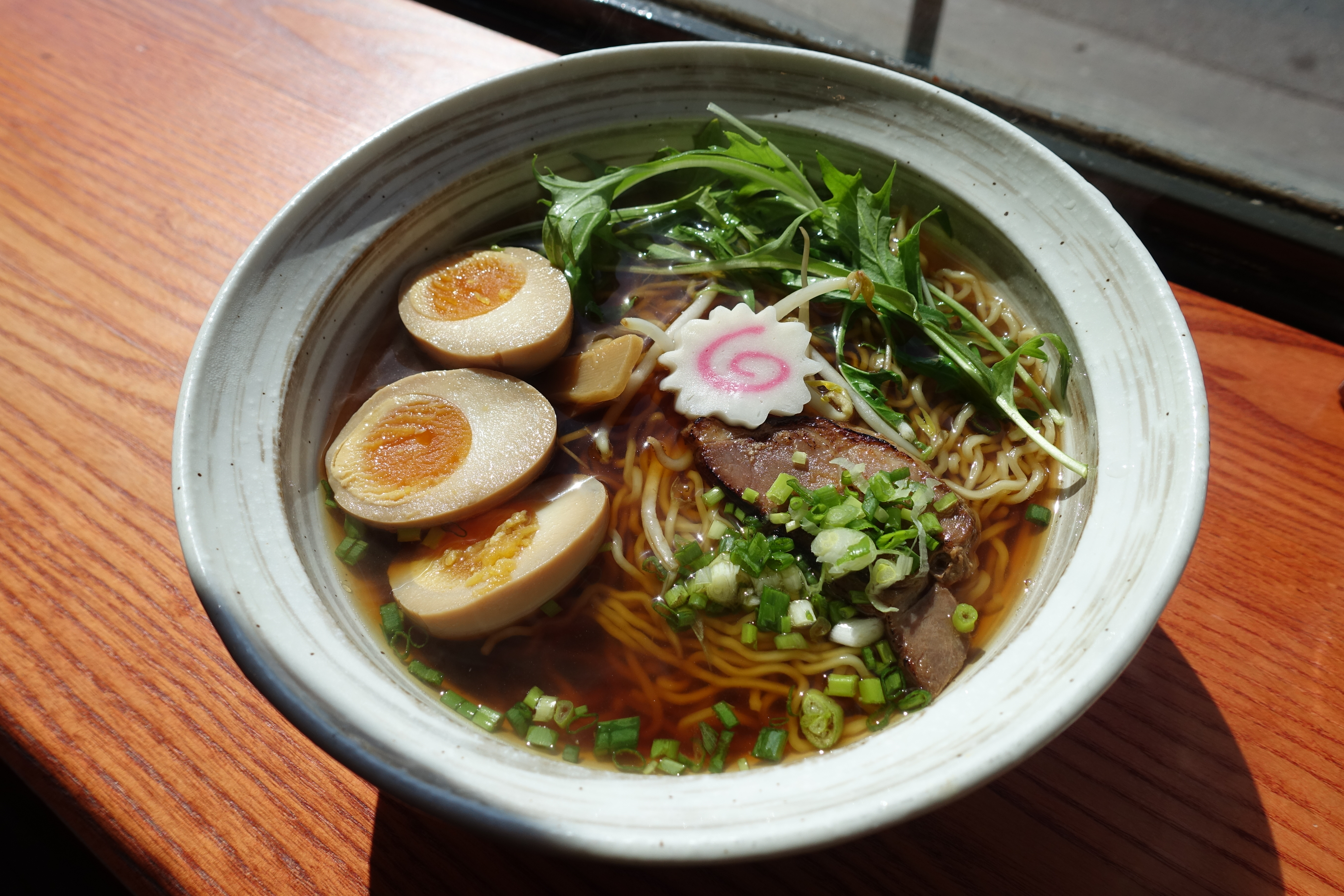
Shoyu ramen, flavored with soy sauce

A condiment that predated soy sauce in Japan was gyoshō (魚醤), a fish sauce. When practitioners of Buddhism came to Japan from China in the 7th century, they introduced vegetarianism and brought many soy-based products with them, such as soy sauce, which is known as shōyu (醤油) in Japan. Shoyu exportation began in 1647 by the Dutch East India Company.

==== Korea ====
The earliest soy sauce brewing in Korea seems to have begun in the era of the Three Kingdoms. Jangdoks used for soy sauce brewing are found in the mural paintings of Anak Tomb No. 3 from the 4th century Goguryeo.

In Samguk sagi, a historical record of the Three Kingdoms era, it is written that ganjang (soy sauce) and doenjang (soybean paste), along with meju (soybean block) and jeotgal (salted seafood), were prepared for the wedding ceremony of the King Sinmun in February 683. Sikhwaji, a section from Goryeosa (History of Goryeo), recorded that ganjang and doenjang were included in the relief supplies in 1018, after a Khitan invasion, and in 1052, when a famine occurred. Joseon texts such as Guhwangchwaryo and Jeungbo sallim gyeongje contain the detailed procedures on how to brew good quality ganjang and doenjang. Gyuhap chongseo explains how to pick a date for brewing, what to forbear, and how to keep and preserve ganjang and doenjang.

==== Philippines ====
In the Philippines, soy sauce was likely first recorded through the documentation of the traditional dish adobo in 1613 via the San Buenaventura paper. Food historian Raymond Sokolov noted that the ingredients used in the dish, including soy sauce, likely were present in the native cuisine even before the colonial-era record.

=== Europe ===
Records of the Dutch East India Company list soy sauce as a commodity in 1737, when seventy-five large barrels were shipped from Dejima, Japan, to Batavia (present-day Jakarta) on the island of Java. Thirty-five barrels from that shipment were then shipped to the Netherlands. In the 18th century, diplomat and scholar Isaac Titsingh published accounts of brewing soy sauce. Although earlier descriptions of soy sauce had been disseminated in the West, his was among the earliest to focus specifically on the brewing of the Japanese version. By the mid-19th century, Japanese soy sauce gradually disappeared from the European market, and the condiment became synonymous with the Chinese product. Europeans were unable to make soy sauce because they did not have access to Aspergillus oryzae, the fungus used in its brewing. Soy sauce made from ingredients such as portobello mushrooms were disseminated in European cookbooks during the late 18th century. A Swedish recipe for "Soija" was published in the 1770 edition of Cajsa Warg's Hjelpreda i Hushållningen för Unga Fruentimber and was flavored with allspice and mace.

=== United States ===
Soy sauce production in the United States began in the Territory of Hawaii in 1905 by Yamajo Soy Co, which by 1909 was renamed the Hawaiian Soy Company Ltd. La Choy started selling hydrolyzed vegetable protein–based soy sauce in 1933.

Until the popularization of authentic Chinese cuisine in the 1970s, some Americans pejoratively nicknamed the sauce "beetle juice". This slur's usage had heavily declined by 1976.

== Production ==
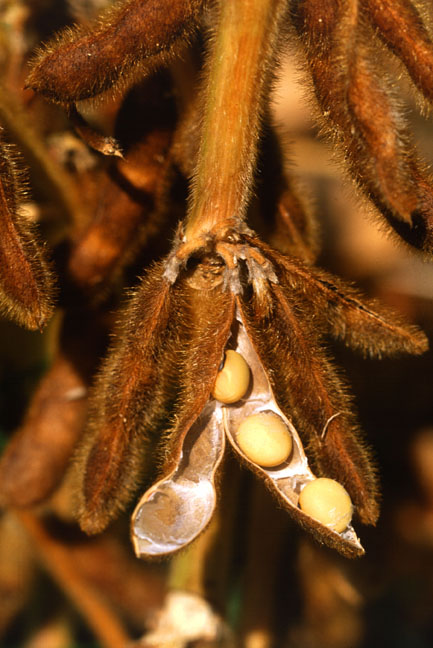
Soy sauce is made from soybeans.

Soy sauce is made either by fermentation or by hydrolysis. Some commercial sauces have both fermented and chemical sauces.

Flavor, color, and aroma developments during production are attributed to non-enzymatic Maillard browning.

Variation is usually achieved as the result of different methods and durations of fermentation, different ratios of water, salt, and fermented soy, or through the addition of other ingredients.

=== Traditional ===
Traditional soy sauces are made by mixing soybeans and grain with mold cultures such as Aspergillus oryzae and other related microorganisms and yeasts (the resulting mixture is called Koji in Japan; the term koji is used both for the mixture of soybeans, wheat, and mold as well as for the mold itself). Historically, the mixture was fermented naturally in large urns and under the sun, which was believed to contribute extra flavors. Today, the mixture is placed in a temperature- and humidity-controlled incubation chamber.

Traditional soy sauces take months to make:

1. Soaking and cooking: The soybeans are soaked in water and boiled until cooked. Wheat is roasted and crushed.
2. Koji culturing: Equal amounts of boiled soybeans and roasted wheat are mixed to form a grain mixture. A culture of Aspergillus spore is added to the grain mixture and mixed, or the mixture is allowed to gather spores from the environment itself. The cultures include:
  - Aspergillus: a genus of fungus that is used for fermenting various ingredients (the cultures are called koji in Japanese). Three species are used for brewing soy sauce:
    - A. oryzae: Strains with high proteolytic capacity are used for brewing soy sauce.
    - A. sojae: This fungus also has a high proteolytic capacity.
    - A. tamarii: This fungus is used for brewing tamari, a variety of soy sauce.
  - Saccharomyces cerevisiae: the yeasts in the culture convert some of the sugars to ethanol, which can undergo secondary reactions to make other flavor compounds
  - Other microbes contained in the culture:
    - Bacillus spp. (genus): This organism is likely to grow in soy sauce ingredients, and to generate odors and ammonia.
    - Lactobacillus species: This organism makes a lactic acid that increases the acidity in the feed.
3. Brewing: The cultured grain mixture is mixed into a specific amount of salt brine for wet fermentation or with coarse salt for dry fermentation and left to brew. Over time, the Aspergillus mold on the soy and wheat break down the grain proteins into free amino acid and protein fragments and starches into simple sugars. This amino-glycosidic reaction gives soy sauce its dark brown color. Lactic acid bacteria ferments the sugars into lactic acid and yeast makes ethanol, which through aging and secondary fermentation makes numerous flavor compounds typical of soy sauce.
4. Pressing: The fully fermented grain slurry is placed into cloth-lined containers and pressed to separate the solids from the liquid soy sauce. The isolated solids are used as fertilizer or fed to animals while the liquid soy sauce is processed further.
5. Pasteurization: The raw soy sauce is heated to eliminate any active yeasts and molds remaining in the soy sauce and can be filtered to remove any fine particulates.
6. Storage: The soy sauce can be aged or directly bottled and sold.

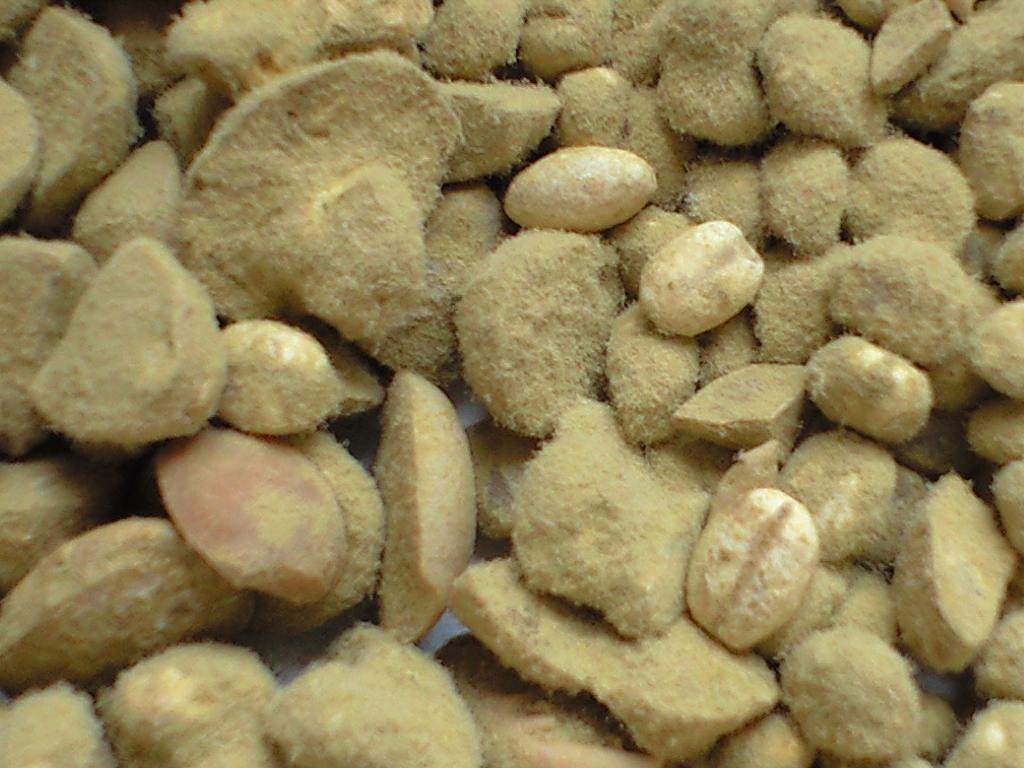
Soy and wheat with Aspergillus sojae cultures to brew soy sauce

=== High-salt liquid-state fermented soy sauce ===
High-salt liquid-state fermentation (HLF) of soybeans depends heavily on microbial activity, metabolism and enzymatic hydrolysis of macronutrients. Most traditional approaches fall into the scope of HLF.

- During HLF, koji-infused soybeans are exposed to air so that hydrolytic enzymes of the mold can continuously break down macronutrients within the soybean.
- Ample water, usually about 2 to 2.5 times the weight of the feed, is required to support sufficient microbial growth.
- High salt concentration (17–20%) is required to selectively inhibit microbial activity.
- HLF is generally carried out at 15–30 °C (59–86 °F), and requires a long ageing period, usually from 90 to 180 days. In the aging period, constant stirring of moromi (a mash/mixture of wheat (optionally), salt, soy beans, water, and fermenting yeast) is required for distributing nutrients, as well as flavoring compounds evenly. In some cases, moromi is exposed to direct sunlight to facilitate the decomposition of macronutrients.
- Due to the high salinity of HLF moromi, only anaerobic halophiles can survive in the medium. Also, the 15–30 °C (59–86 °F) temperature range allows only the growth of mesophiles. Similar to the fermentation of pickles, the primary lactic acid fermentation of sugars by halophiles reduces the pH of moromi down to acidic range. Low pH further limits the growth of undesirable microbes, but favors the growth of fermentative yeast which contributes to secondary fermentation that generates various flavoring compounds and odorants.

=== Low-salt solid-state fermented soy sauce ===
LSF, also referred as rapid fermenting, is a modern fermentation method invented in response to high market demand.

- Compared to HLF, LSF employs pure cultures at a relatively higher temperature (40–55 °C (104–131 °F)) and lower brine solution concentrations (13–15%). In LSF, koji is mixed with the equivalent weight of brine to form solid moromi.
- The elevated temperature accelerates the fermentation process significantly. Due to the short aging (15–30 days) period of LSF, and low production cost, LSF soy sauce accounts for more share of the Chinese soy sauce market.

LSF evolved from salt-free solid-state fermentation, an even faster method working at even higher temperatures (50–65 °C (122–149 °F)) and taking 72 hours to complete, introduced to China from the Soviet Union in 1958. The aging time turned out to be too short develop a proper flavor profile, with burnt acidic notes left in the sauce. LSF is a compromise between this method and the more traditional HLF: the product tastes passable with more microbes allowed to survive, but still lacks depth. Reducing the salt content accelerates brewing by lifting salt-induced enzyme inhibition.

=== Acid-hydrolyzed vegetable protein ===
Some brands of soy sauce are made from acid-hydrolyzed soy protein instead of brewed with a traditional culture. This takes about three days. Although they have a different flavor, aroma, and texture when compared to brewed soy sauces, they can be produced more quickly and cheaply, and also have a longer shelf life and are usually made for these reasons. The clear plastic packets of dark sauce common with Chinese-style take-out food typically use a hydrolyzed vegetable protein formula. Some higher-priced hydrolyzed vegetable protein products with no added sugar or colorings are sold as low-sodium soy sauce alternatives called "liquid aminos" in health food stores, similar to the way salt substitutes are used. These products are, however, not necessarily low in sodium.

== Chemical composition ==
The chemical composition of soy sauce is affected by the proportions of raw materials, fermentation methodologies, fermenting molds and strains, and post-fermentation treatments. Although the formation mechanism of chemical composition in soy sauce is complex, it has been widely accepted that free amino acids, water-soluble peptides and Maillard reaction products in soy sauce are considered as essential chemical composition and to provide core sensory effects. The primary fermentation of lactic-acid-fermenting halophiles lowers the pH of the moromi, and this directly results in the acidic pH range (4.4–5.4) of soy sauce products. The secondary fermentation conducted by heterofermentative microbes provides soy sauce with a wide range of flavor and odorant compounds by breaking down macronutrients. Soy proteins and grain proteins are hydrolyzed into short peptide chains and free amino acids, which adds umami to the product. Based on the result of free amino acid analysis, the most abundant amino acids in Chinese soy sauce product are glutamic acid, aspartic acid, alanine and leucine.

Starch is hydrolyzed into simple sugars which contribute to the sweet flavor in soy sauce. Legume fats may also be decomposed into short chain fatty acids, and the interactions among lipids and other macronutrients also result in a richer flavor in the final product. Non-enzymatic browning also contributes significantly to the development of the properties of soy sauce. The hydrolysis of proteins and large carbohydrates also provides free amino acids and simple sugars as reagents for the Maillard reaction.

Soy sauce may contain more than 1% alcohol and may run afoul of liquor control legislation.

== Sensory profile ==
The taste of soy sauce is predominated by saltiness, followed by moderate umami, sweetness, and finally slight bitterness, which is hard to perceive due to the masking effect of other tastes. The overall flavor of soy sauce is a result of the balance and interaction among different taste components. The saltiness is largely attributed to the presence of NaCl (common salt) in brine. The sugars hydrolyzed from starch add sweetness into soy sauce. Umami is largely caused by the presence of free amino acids, mainly glutamine and aspartic acid. Sodium from the brine and disodium ribonucleotides from the soy also add to the umami. Other amino acids cause additional basic flavors, with sweet coming from Ala, Gly, Ser, and Thr; bitter coming from Arg, His, Ile, Leu, Met, Phe, Trp, Tyr, and Val; and no taste from Cys, Lys, and Pro. The amino-acid nitrogen content, an indication of the free amino acid concentration, is used in China for grading soy sauce. The highest "special grade" is defined at ≥ 0.8 g/100 mL.

Despite a large variety of volatile and odorant compounds that have been identified in soy sauce, the food product per se does not present a strong aroma. Alcohols, acids, esters, aldehydes, ketones, phenols, heterocyclic compounds, alkynes and benzenes have been identified in Chinese soy sauces. An explanation for this observation is that the aroma of soy sauce does not depend largely on the aroma-active compounds. The subtle aroma is a result of a "critical balance" achieved among all volatile and odorant compounds, whose respective concentrations are relatively low.

== Variations by country ==
Soy sauce is widely used as an important flavoring and has been integrated into the traditional cuisines of many East Asian and Southeast Asian cultures. Despite their rather similar appearance, soy sauces made in different cultures and regions are different in taste, consistency, fragrance and saltiness. Soy sauce retains its quality longer when kept away from direct sunlight.

=== Burmese ===
Burmese soy sauce production is dated back to the Bagan Era in the 9th and 10th century. Scripts written in praise of pe ngan byar yay (ပဲငံပြာရည်, literally "bean fish sauce") were found. Thick soy sauce is called kya nyo (ကြာညို့, from Chinese jiàngyóu).

=== Chinese ===
Chinese soy sauces (Chinese: 醬油; pinyin: jiàng yóu; Jyutping: zoeng3 jau4; Cantonese Yale: jeungyàuh; or alternatively, 豉油; pinyin: chǐyóu; Jyutping: si6jau4; Cantonese Yale: sihyàuh) are primarily made from soybeans, with relatively low amounts of other grains. Chinese soy sauce produced by fermentation can be roughly split into two classes: brewed (direct fermented) or blended (with additives), occupying about 40% and 60% of market share respectively. Sauces can also be classed by fermentation technology (shown above) into Low-Salt Solid-State fermented soy sauce (LSF; 低鹽固態) and High-Salt Liquid-State fermented soy sauce (HLF; 高鹽稀態), occupying about 90% and 10% of market share respectively.

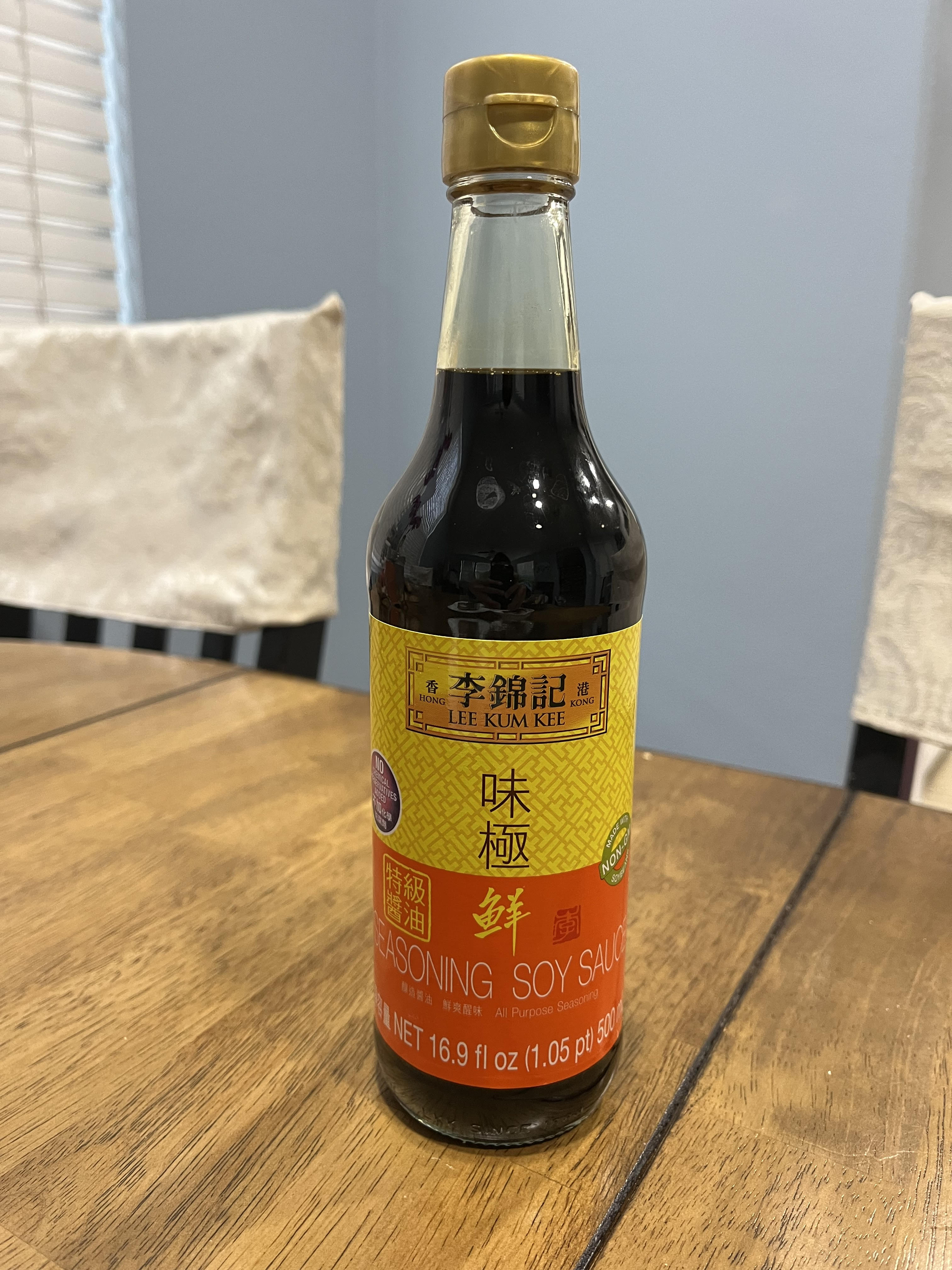
A bottle of soy sauce manufactured by Lee Kum Kee

==== Brewed ====
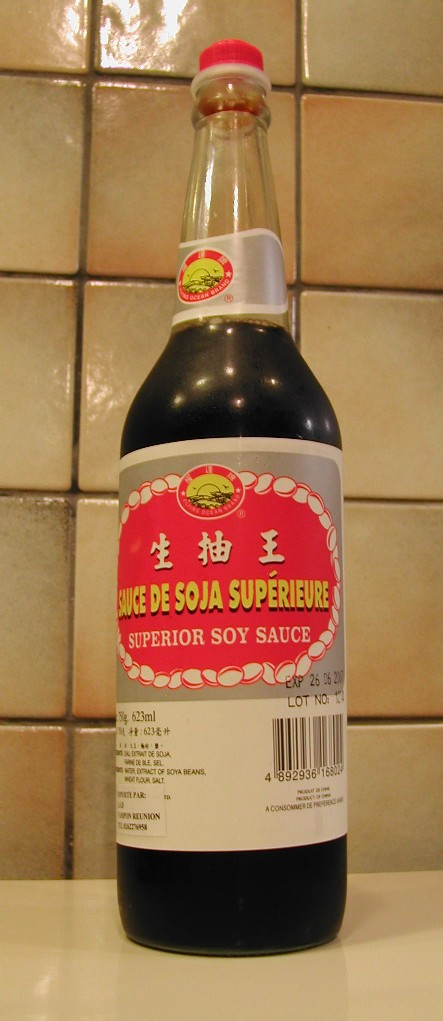
A bottle of commercially made light soy sauce

Soy sauce can be brewed directly from a fermentation process using wheat, soybeans, salt, and water without additional additives.

- Light or fresh (生抽; pinyin: shēng chōu; Jyutping: saang1 cau1; Cantonese Yale: sāangchāu or 醬清; pinyin: jiàng qīng; Jyutping: zoeng3 cing1; Cantonese Yale: jeungchīng): is a thin (low viscosity), opaque, lighter brown soy sauce, brewed by first culturing steamed wheat and soybeans with Aspergillus, and then letting the mixture ferment in brine. It is the main soy sauce used for seasoning, since it is saltier, has less noticeable color, and also adds a distinct flavor.
  - Tóu chōu (頭抽): A light soy sauce made from the first pressing of the soybeans, this can be loosely translated as "first soy sauce" or referred to as premium light soy sauce. Tóu chōu is sold at a premium because, like extra virgin olive oil, the flavor of the first pressing is considered superior. Due to its delicate flavor it is used primarily for seasoning light dishes and for dipping.
  - Shuāng huáng (雙璜): A light soy sauce that is double-fermented by using the light soy sauce from another batch to take the place of brine for a second brewing. This adds further complexity to the flavor of the light soy sauce. Due to its complex flavor this soy sauce is used primarily for dipping.
- Yìn yóu (蔭油): A darker soy sauce brewed primarily in Taiwan by culturing only steamed soybeans with Aspergillus and mixing the cultured soybeans with coarse rock salt before undergoing prolonged dry fermentation. The flavor of this soy sauce is complex and rich and is used for dipping or in red cooking. For the former use, yìn yóu can be thickened with starch to make a thick soy sauce.

==== Blended ====
Additives with sweet or umami tastes are sometimes added to a finished brewed soy sauce to modify its taste and texture.

- Dark and old soy sauce (老抽; pinyin: lǎo chōu; Jyutping: lou5 cau1; Cantonese Yale: lóuhchāu), a darker and slightly thicker soy sauce made from light soy sauce. This soy sauce is made through prolonged aging and may contain added caramel colour or molasses to give it its distinctive appearance. It has a richer, slightly sweeter, and less salty flavour than light soy sauce. This variety is mainly used during cooking, since its flavour develops during heating. Dark soy sauce is mainly used to add color and flavor to a dish after cooking. One of the strongest varieties is known as "double black" (雙老頭抽)
  - Mushroom dark soy (草菇老抽 cǎogū lǎochōu): In the finishing and aging process of making dark soy sauce, the broth of Volvariella volvacea (straw mushroom) is mixed into the soy sauce and is then exposed to the sun to make this type of dark soy. The added broth gives this soy sauce a richer flavor than plain dark soy sauce.
  - Thick soy sauce (醬油膏 jiàng yóu gāo) is a dark soy sauce that has been thickened with heat and sugar; occasionally a starch thickener and MSG are used. This sauce is often used as a dipping sauce or finishing sauce and poured on food as a flavorful addition. However, due to its sweetness and caramelized flavors from its production process, the sauce is also used in red cooking. This style is particularly common with Taiwanese breakfast foods.
- Shrimp soy sauce (蝦子醬油 xiā zǐ jiàngyóu): Fresh soy sauce is simmered with fresh shrimp and finished with sugar, baijiu (a type of distilled liquor, 白酒), and spices. It is a specialty of Suzhou.

Besides the above traditional types, hydrolyzed vegetable protein and other flavor enhancers may be mixed with brewed soy sauce to produce cheaper substitutes. This type is known as "blended soy sauce" (Chinese: 配製醬油) in China until 2019, when a Chinese 2018 standard that removed this type from the definition of soy sauce went into effect.

The 2018 Chinese standard defines soy sauce as "liquid condiments with special color, aroma and taste made from soybeans and/or defatted soybeans, wheat and/or wheat flour and/or wheat bran as main raw materials through microbial fermentation." It still allows food additives to be used "following the definitions of GB 2760", which does not restrict the use of MSG and disodium ribonucleotides. (Hydrolyzed vegetable protein is not listed as a food additive in GB 2760 and is therefore unacceptable in products labelled as "soy sauce".)

=== Filipino ===
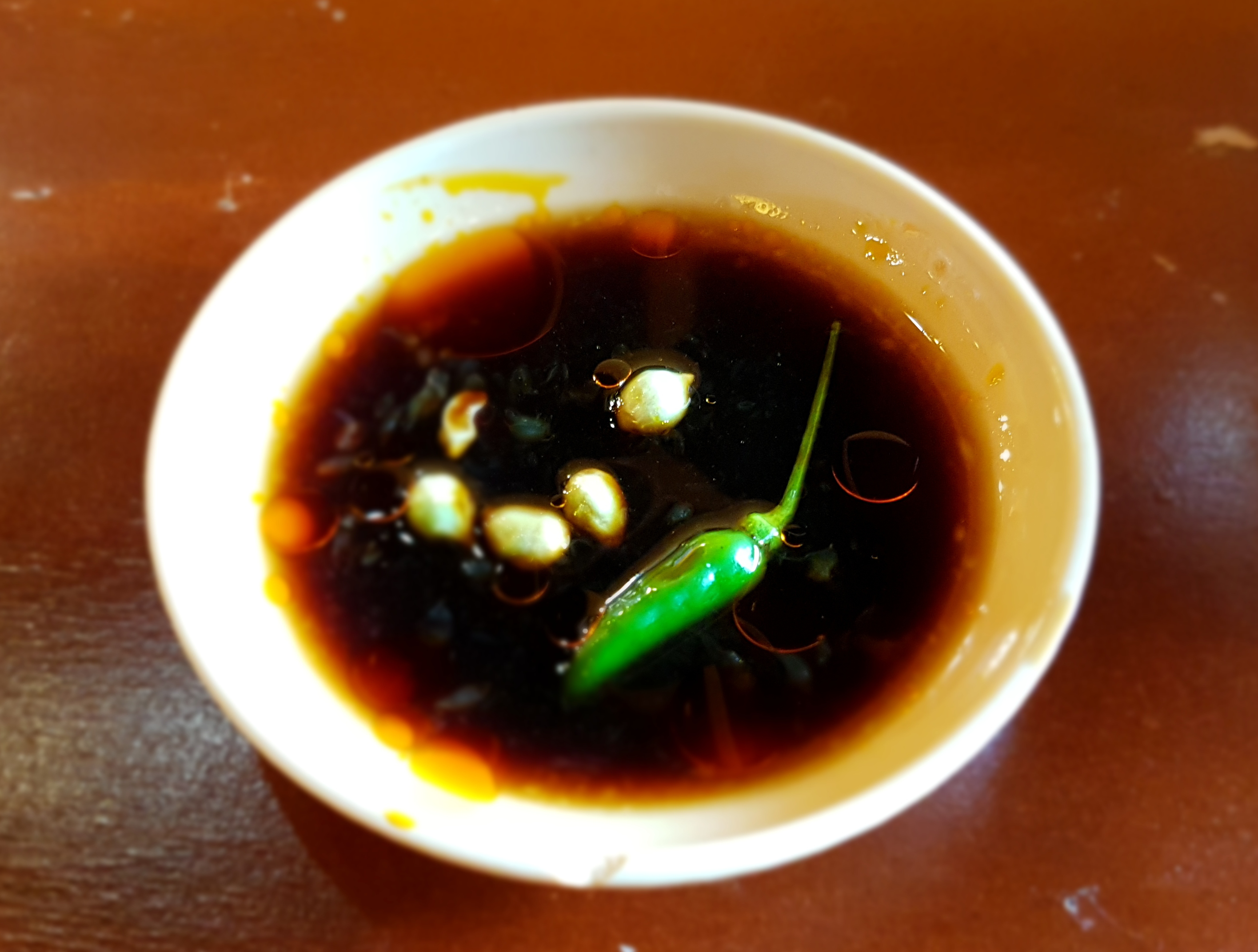
Toyomansi, a typical Filipino dipping sauce composed of soy sauce and calamansi spiced with siling labuyo

In the Philippines, soy sauce is called toyò in the native languages, derived from tau-yu in Philippine Hokkien. Philippine soy sauce is usually a combination of soybeans, wheat, salt, and caramel color. It is thinner in texture and has a saltier taste than its Southeast Asian counterparts. It is most similar to the Japanese koikuchi shōyu in terms of consistency and the use of wheat, though toyò is slightly saltier and darker in color.

Toyò is used as a marinade, an ingredient in cooked dishes, and most often as a table condiment, usually alongside other sauces such as fish sauce (patís) and sugar cane vinegar (sukà). It is often mixed and served with the juice of the calamansi (× Citrofortunella microcarpa; also called calamondin, limonsito). The combination is known as toyomansî, which can be comparable to the Japanese ponzu sauce (soy sauce with yuzu). Toyò is also a main ingredient in Philippine adobo, one of the more famous dishes of Filipino cuisine.

=== Hawaiian ===
Soy sauce is a ubiquitous condiment and ingredient in many dishes in Hawaiian cuisine, where it is commonly known by its Japanese name shōyu by locals. Aloha Shoyu is a soy sauce manufacturer in Hawaii that produces a popular soy sauce whose flavor is more delicate and somewhat sweeter compared to other more well-known soy sauces.

=== Indonesian ===
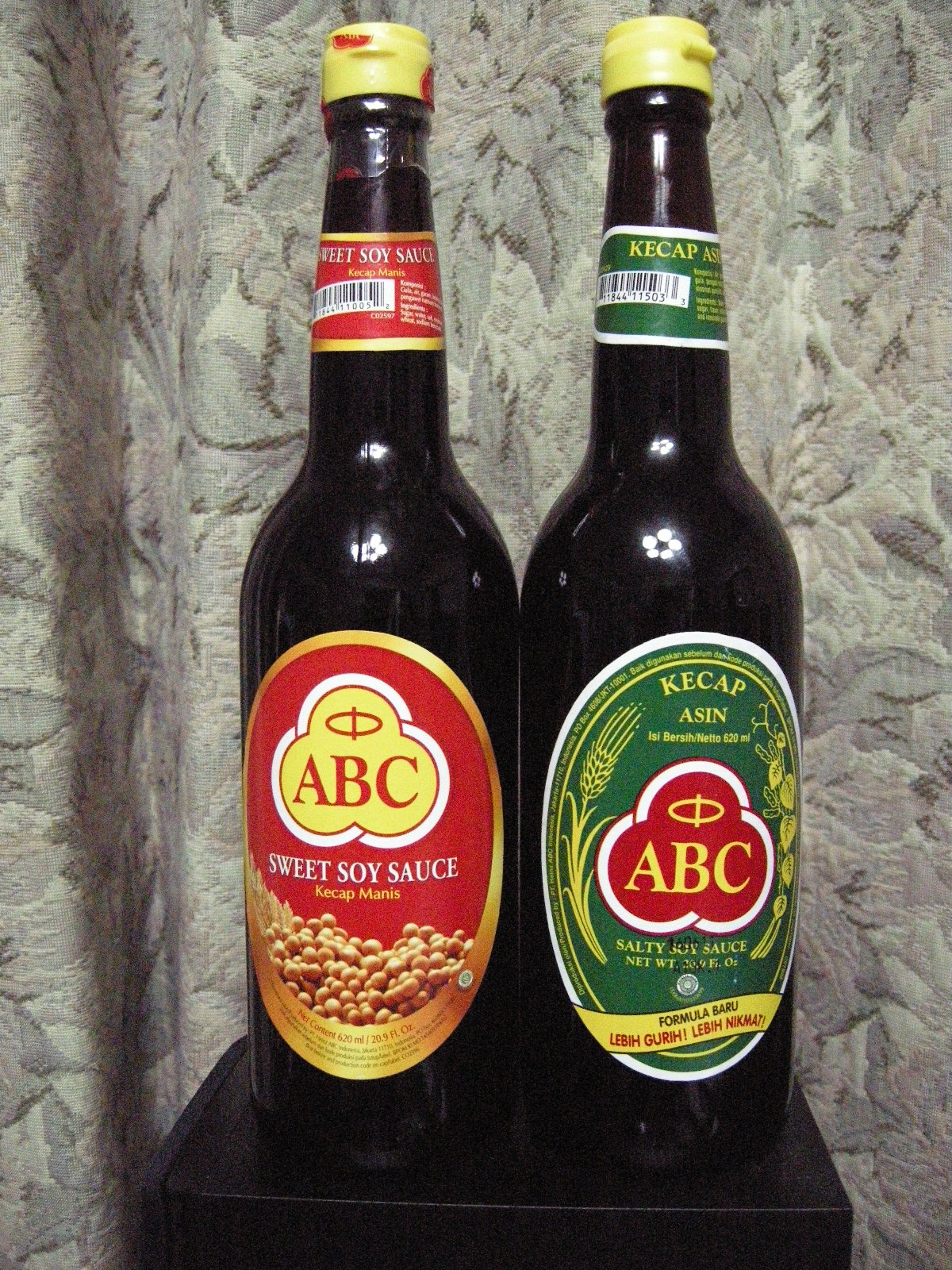
Left, ABC brand Kecap manis sweet Indonesian soy sauce is nearly as thick as molasses; right, Kecap asin

In Indonesia, soy sauce is known as kecap (old spelling: ketjap), which is a catch-all term for fermented sauces, and cognate to the English word "ketchup". The most popular type of soy sauce in Indonesian cuisine is kecap manis or sweet soy sauce. The term kecap is also used to describe other condiments and sauces of a similar appearance, such as kecap ikan (fish sauce) and kecap Inggris (worcestershire sauce; lit. "English sauce" or "England sauce"). Three common varieties of soy-based kecap exist in Indonesian cuisine, used either as ingredients or condiments:

- Kecap manis: Sweetened soy sauce, which has a thick syrupy consistency and a unique, pronounced, sweet, somewhat treacle-like flavor due to generous addition of palm sugar. Regular soy with brown sugar and a trace of molasses added can substitute. It is by far the most popular type of soy sauce employed in Indonesian cuisine, accounts for an estimated 90 percent of the nation's total soy sauce production. Kecap manis is an important sauce in Indonesian signature dishes, such as nasi goreng, mie goreng, satay, tongseng and semur. Sambal kecap for example is type of sambal dipping sauce of kecap manis with sliced chili, tomato and shallot, a popular dipping sauce for sate kambing (goat meat satay) and ikan bakar (grilled fish/seafood). Since soy sauce is of Chinese origin, kecap asin is also an important seasoning in Chinese Indonesian cuisine.
- Kecap manis sedang: Medium sweet soy sauce, which has a less thick consistency, is less sweet and has a saltier taste than kecap manis.
- Kecap asin: Regular soy sauce derived from the Japanese shoyu, but usually more concentrated and thicker, with a darker color and stronger flavor; it can be replaced by Chinese light soy sauce in some recipes. Salty soy sauce was first introduced into Indonesia by Hokkien people so its taste resembles that of Chinese soy sauce. Hakka soy sauce made from black beans is very salty and large productions are mainly made in Bangka Island.

=== Japanese ===
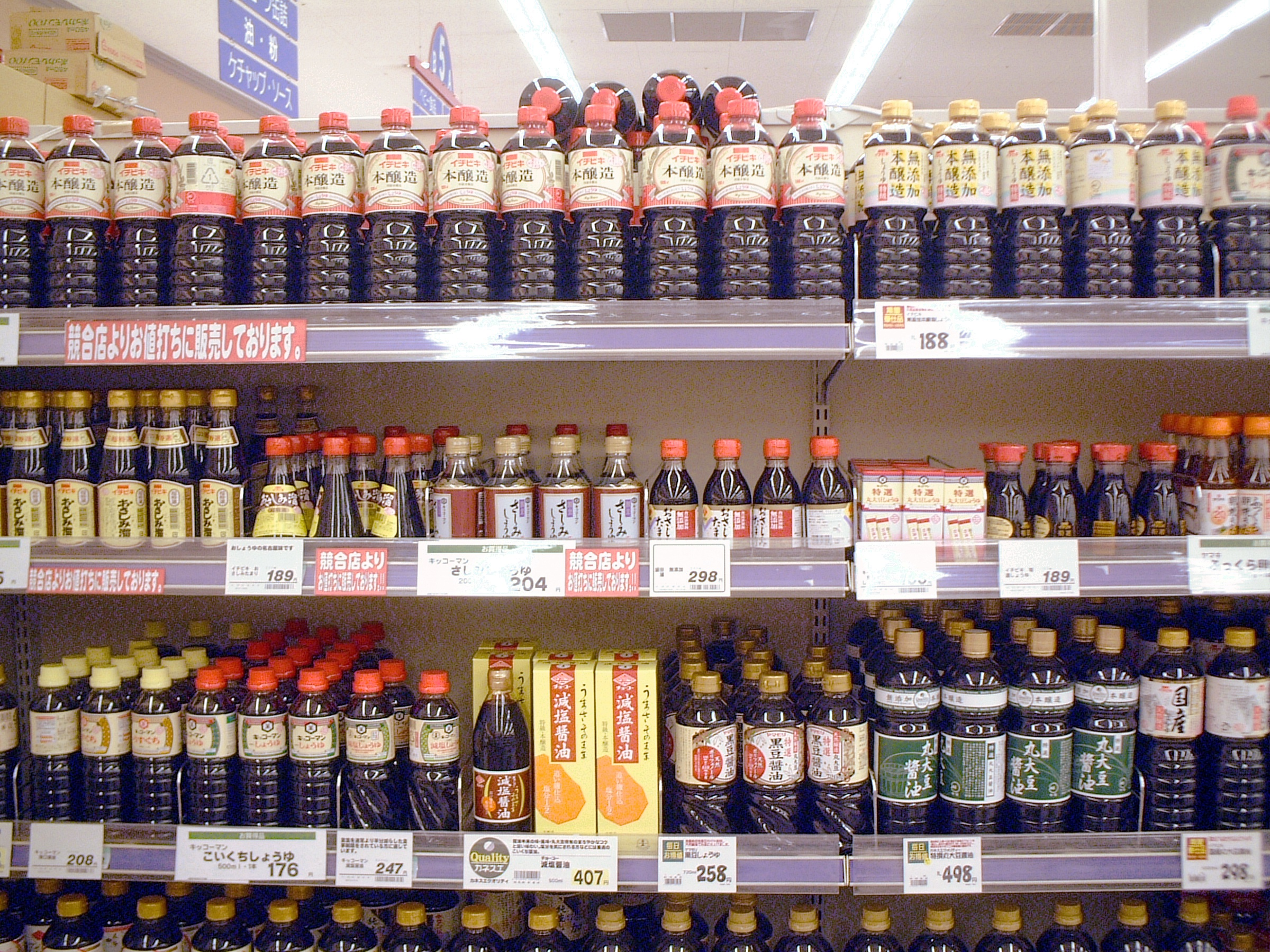
Japanese supermarket soy sauce corner

Shōyu is officially divided into five main types by the JAS (Japanese Agricultural Standard) depending on differences in their ingredients and method of production. These types are koikuchi, usukuchi, tamari, saishikomi, and shiro.

Most, but not all, Japanese soy sauces include wheat as a primary ingredient, which tends to give them a slightly sweeter taste than their Chinese counterparts. They also tend towards an alcoholic sherry-like flavor, sometimes enhanced by the addition of small amounts of alcohol as a natural preservative. The widely varying flavors of these soy sauces are not always interchangeable, so some recipes only call for one type or the other, much as a white wine cannot replace a red's flavor or beef stock does not make the same results as chicken stock.

Some soy sauces made in the Japanese way or styled after them contain about 50% wheat.

==== Varieties ====
- Koikuchi (濃口; 'thick taste'): Originating in the Kantō region, its usage eventually spread all over Japan. Over 80% of the Japanese domestic soy sauce production is of koikuchi, and can be considered the typical Japanese soy sauce. It is made from roughly equal quantities of soybean and wheat. This variety is also called kijōyu (生醤油) or namashōyu (生しょうゆ) when it is not pasteurized.
- Usukuchi (薄口; 'thin taste'): Almost 14% of soy sauce production is usukuchi shoyu. It is particularly popular in the Kansai region of Japan. It matures for less time than koichuchi and is both saltier and lighter in color. It is paler due to the use in its production of amazake, a sweet liquid made from fermented rice. Usukuchi is commonly used in cooking as it does not alter the color and taste of the ingredients.
- Tamari (たまり): Made mainly in the Chūbu region of Japan, tamari is darker in appearance and richer in flavor than koikuchi. It contains little or no wheat. Wheat-free tamari can be used by people with gluten intolerance. Tamari is more viscous than koikuchi shoyu. Of soy sauce produced in Japan, 1.5% is tamari. It is the "original" Japanese soy sauce, as its recipe is closest to the soy sauce originally introduced to Japan from China. Technically, this variety is known as miso-damari (味噌溜り), as this is the liquid that runs off miso (a soybean-based seasoning and soup base) as it matures. The Japanese word tamari is derived from the verb tamaru (溜る; 'to accumulate'), referring to the fact that tamari was traditionally a liquid byproduct made during the fermentation of miso. Japan remains the leading producer of tamari, though it has also become popular in the United States. Tamari shoyu is often used for sashimi. Oftentimes, other varieties of soy sauce for sashimi are inaccurately referred to as tamari shoyu. The back label in Japan, by law, will clarify whether or not it is actually tamari.
- Shiro (白; 'white'): In contrast to tamari soy sauce, shiro uses mostly wheat and very little soybean, lending it a light appearance and sweet taste. It is more commonly used in the Kansai region to highlight the appearances of food, for example sashimi. Shiro shoyu used to be used a lot in high-class cookery and is generally not available abroad. Its main use is for pickles. Of soy sauce production in Japan, 0.7% is shiro.
- Saishikomi (再仕込; 'twice-brewed'): This variety substitutes previously made koikuchi for the brine normally used in the process. Consequently, it is much darker and more strongly flavored. This type is also known as kanro shōyu (甘露醤油; 'sweet soy sauce'). Of soy sauce production in Japan, 0.8% is saishikomi.
- Kanro shoyu is a variety of soy sauce made exclusively in Yanai, a city in Yamaguchi Prefecture. It is handmade and is less salty and less sweet than saishikomi shoyu.
- Amakuchi (甘口, 'sweet taste'): It is similar to koikuchi soy sauce, but with sweetener added. It is the most popular type of soy sauce in Kyushu region of Japan, which is famous for sweet foods. In some cases, it is more common to find amakuchi shoyu than koikuchi shoyu in Kyushu.

Newer varieties of Japanese soy sauce include:

- Gen'en (減塩; 'reduced salt'): This version contains 50% less salt than regular soy sauce for consumers concerned about heart disease.
- Usujio (薄塩; 'light salt'): This version contains 20% less salt than regular soy sauce.

All of these varieties are sold in three different grades according to how they were made:

- Honjōzō (本醸造; 'genuine fermented'): Contains 100% genuine fermented product
- Kongō-jōzō (混合醸造; 'mixed fermented'): Contains genuine fermented shōyu mash mixed with 30–50% of chemical or enzymatic hydrolysate of plant protein
- Kongō (混合; 'mixed'): Contains honjōzō or Kongō-jōzō shōyu mixed with 30–50% of chemical or enzymatic hydrolysate of plant protein

All the varieties and grades may be sold according to three official levels of quality:

- Hyōjun (標準): standard grade, contains more than 1.2% total nitrogen
- Jōkyū (上級): upper grade, contains more than 1.35% of total nitrogen
- Tokkyū (特級): special grade, contains more than 1.5% of total nitrogen

=== Korean ===
In South Korea, soy sauces or ganjang (간장, "seasoning sauce") can be roughly split into two categories: hansik ganjang ('Korean-style soy sauce') and gaeryang ganjang ('modernized soy sauce'). The term ganjang can also refer to non-soy-based salty condiments, such as eo-ganjang fish sauce.

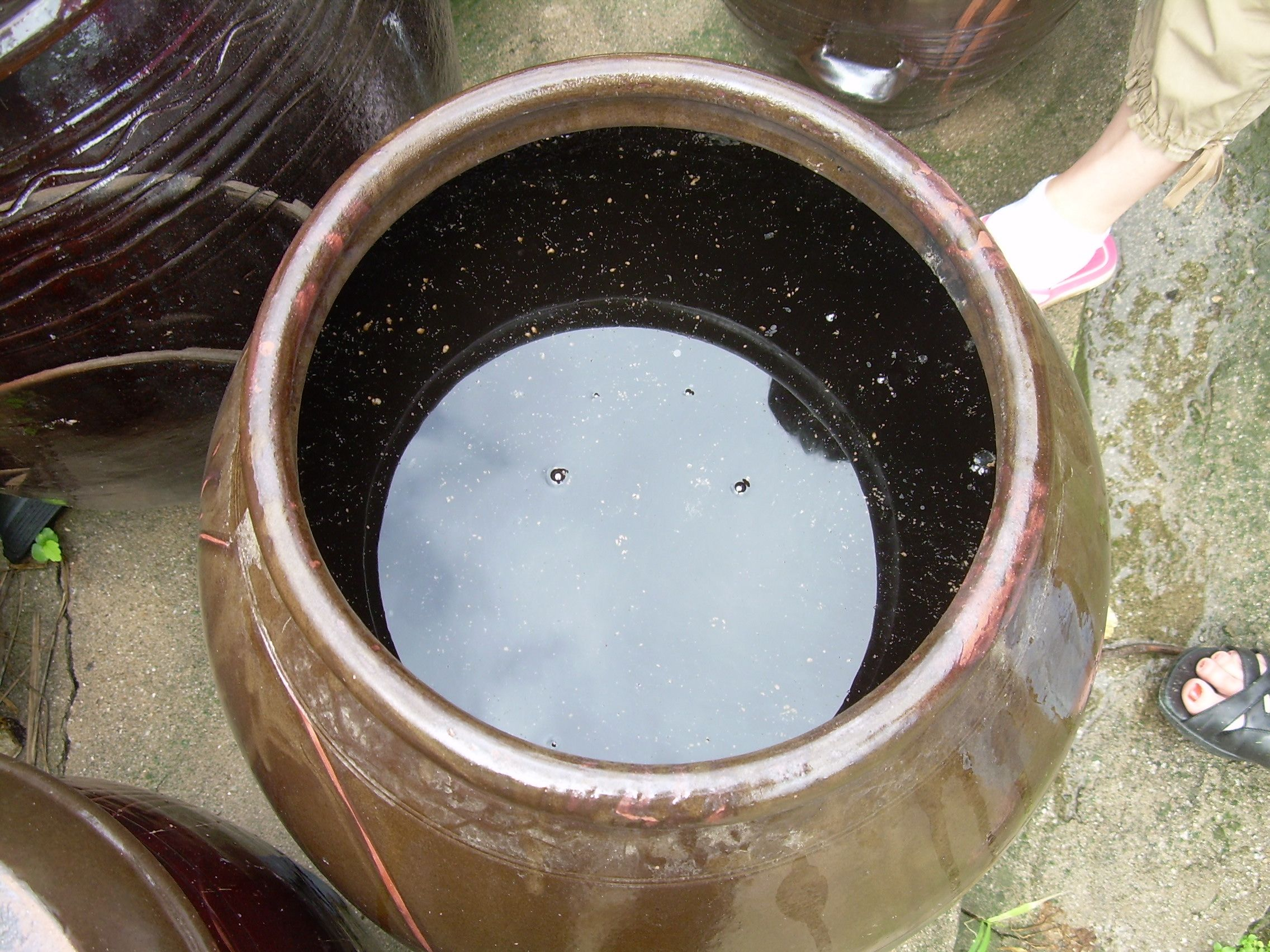
Traditional Korean soy sauce

==== Hansik ganjang ====
Hansik ganjang (한식간장, 'Korean-style soy sauce') is made entirely of fermented soybean (meju) and brine. It is a byproduct of doenjang (fermented soybean paste) production, and has a unique fermented soybean flavour. Both lighter in colour and saltier than other Korean ganjang varieties, hansik ganjang is used mainly in guk (soup) and namul (seasoned vegetable dish) in modern Korean cuisine. Common names for hansik ganjang include jaeraesik ganjang (재래식 간장, "traditional soy sauce"), Joseon-ganjang (조선간장, "Joseon soy sauce"), and guk-ganjang (국간장, "soup soy sauce"). The homebrewed variety is also called jip-ganjang (집간장, "home soy sauce").

Depending on the length of aging, hansik ganjang can be divided into three main varieties: clear, middle, and dark.

- Haet-ganjang (햇간장, "new soy sauce") – soy sauce aged for a year. Also called cheongjang (청장, "clear soy sauce").
- Jung-ganjang (중간장, "middle soy sauce") – soy sauce aged for three to four years.
- Jin-ganjang (진간장, "dark soy sauce") – soy sauce aged for more than five years. Also called jinjang (진장, "aged soy sauce"), nongjang (농장, "thick soy sauce"), or jingamjang (진감장, "aged mature soy sauce").

The Korean Ministry of Food and Drug Safety's Food Code classifies hansik-ganjang into two categories by their ingredients.

- Jaerae-hansik-ganjang (재래한식간장, "traditional Korean-style soy sauce") – made with traditional style meju and brine.
- Gaeryang-hansik-ganjang (개량한식간장, "modernized Korean-style soy sauce") – made with nontraditional meju (which can be made of regular soybean, rice, barley, wheat, or soybean meal, and ripened using traditional method or Aspergillus) and brine.

==== Gaeryang ganjang ====
Gaeryang-ganjang (개량간장, "modernized soy sauce"), referring to varieties of soy sauces not made of meju, is now the most widely used type of soy sauce in modern Korean cuisine. The word ganjang without modifiers in bokkeum (stir-fry), jorim (braised or simmered dishes), and jjim (steamed dishes) recipes usually mean gaeryang-ganjang. Another common name of gaeryang-ganjang is jin-ganjang (진간장, "dark soy sauce"), because gaeryang-ganjang varieties are usually darker in appearance compared to traditional hansik ganjang. Having been introduced to Korea during the era of Japanese forced occupation, garyang ganjang is also called Wae-ganjang (왜간장, "Wae soy sauce").

Korean Ministry of Food and Drug Safety's Food Code classifies gaeryang-ganjang into four categories by their method of production.

- Brewed soy sauce (양조간장, yangjo-ganjang) – made by fermenting soybean, soybean meal, or other grains with saline solution.
- Acid-hydrolyzed soy sauce (산분해간장) – made by hydrolyzing raw materials containing protein with acid.
- Enzyme-hydrolyzed soy sauce (효소분해간장) – made by hydrolyzing raw materials containing protein with enzyme.
- Blended soy sauce (혼합간장) – Also called mixed soy sauce, blended soy sauce can be made by blending hansik-ganjang (Korean-style soy sauce) or yangjo-ganjang (brewed soy sauce) with acid-hydrolyzed soy sauce or enzyme-hydrolyzed soy sauce.

==== Other ====
- Eo-ganjang (어간장, "fish sauce"): Made mainly in Jeju Island, eo-ganjang is a soy sauce substitute made of jeotgal (fermented fish).

=== Malaysian and Singaporean ===
Malays from Malaysia, using the Malay dialect similar to Indonesian, use the word kicap for soy sauce. Kicap is traditionally of two types: kicap lemak (lit "fat/rich soy sauce") and kicap cair. Kicap lemak is similar to Indonesian kecap manis but with very much less sugar, while kicap cair is the Malaysian equivalent of kecap asin.

=== Peru ===
Soy sauce, known in Peru as sillao from the Cantonese name of the item, is an important ingredient in Chifa.

=== Sri Lankan ===
Soy sauce (Sinhala: සෝයා සෝස්) is a popular food product used in Sri Lanka and is a major ingredient used in the nationally popular street food dish kottu. Soy sauce has largely been produced by the Sri Lankan Chinese community but its production has also spread to other communities in Sri Lanka. Soy sauce production in Sri Lanka is the same as the production of soy sauce in Indonesia. Fermentation occurs over a period of three months. The soy beans which are steeped in brine are then pressed to obtain a liquid sauce.

=== Taiwanese ===
The history of soy sauce making in Taiwan can be traced back to southeastern China, in the provinces of Fujian and Guangdong. Taiwanese soy sauce is known for its black bean variant, known as black bean soy sauce (黑豆蔭油), which producers claim to have stronger flavor and more nutrition. Most soy sauce makers in Taiwan make soy sauce from soybeans and wheat using machines, which is a technique introduced during Japanese rule. A smaller number of producers continue to handmake soy sauce in the traditional way.

=== Thai ===
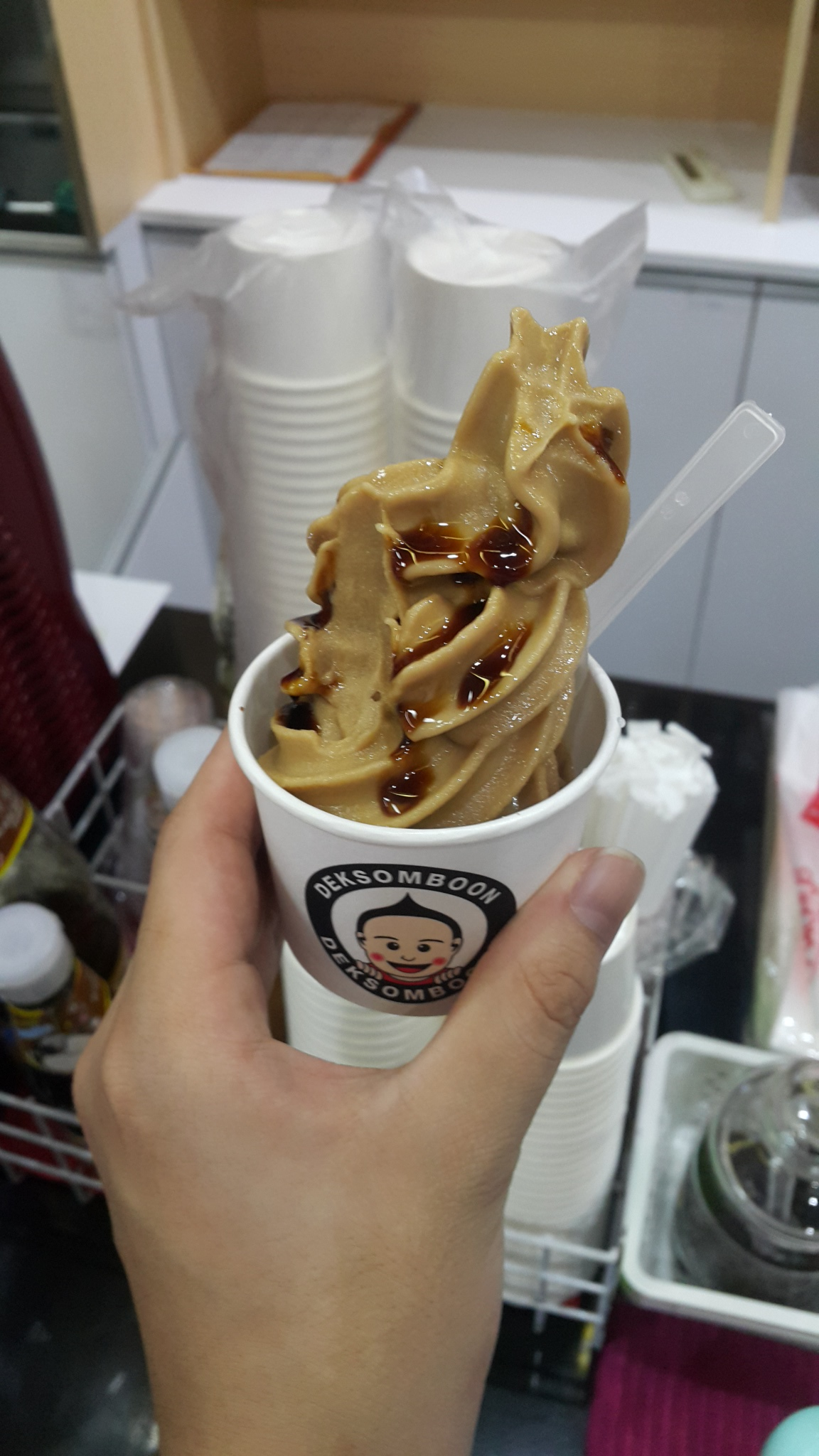
Soft serve usually topped with Thai sweet soy sauce served at Yaowarat, Bangkok, Thailand

In Thailand, soy sauce is called sii-íu (Thai: ซีอิ๊ว). Sii-íu kǎao (Thai: ซีอิ๊วขาว, 'white soy sauce') is used as regular soy sauce in Thai cuisine, while sii-íu dam (Thai: ซีอิ๊วดำ, 'black soy sauce') is used primarily for colour. Another darker-coloured variety, sii-íu wǎan (Thai: ซีอิ๊วหวาน, 'sweet soy sauce') is used for dipping sauces. Sɔ́ɔt prung rót (Thai: ซอสปรุงรส, 'seasoning sauce') is also commonly used in modern Thai cuisine.

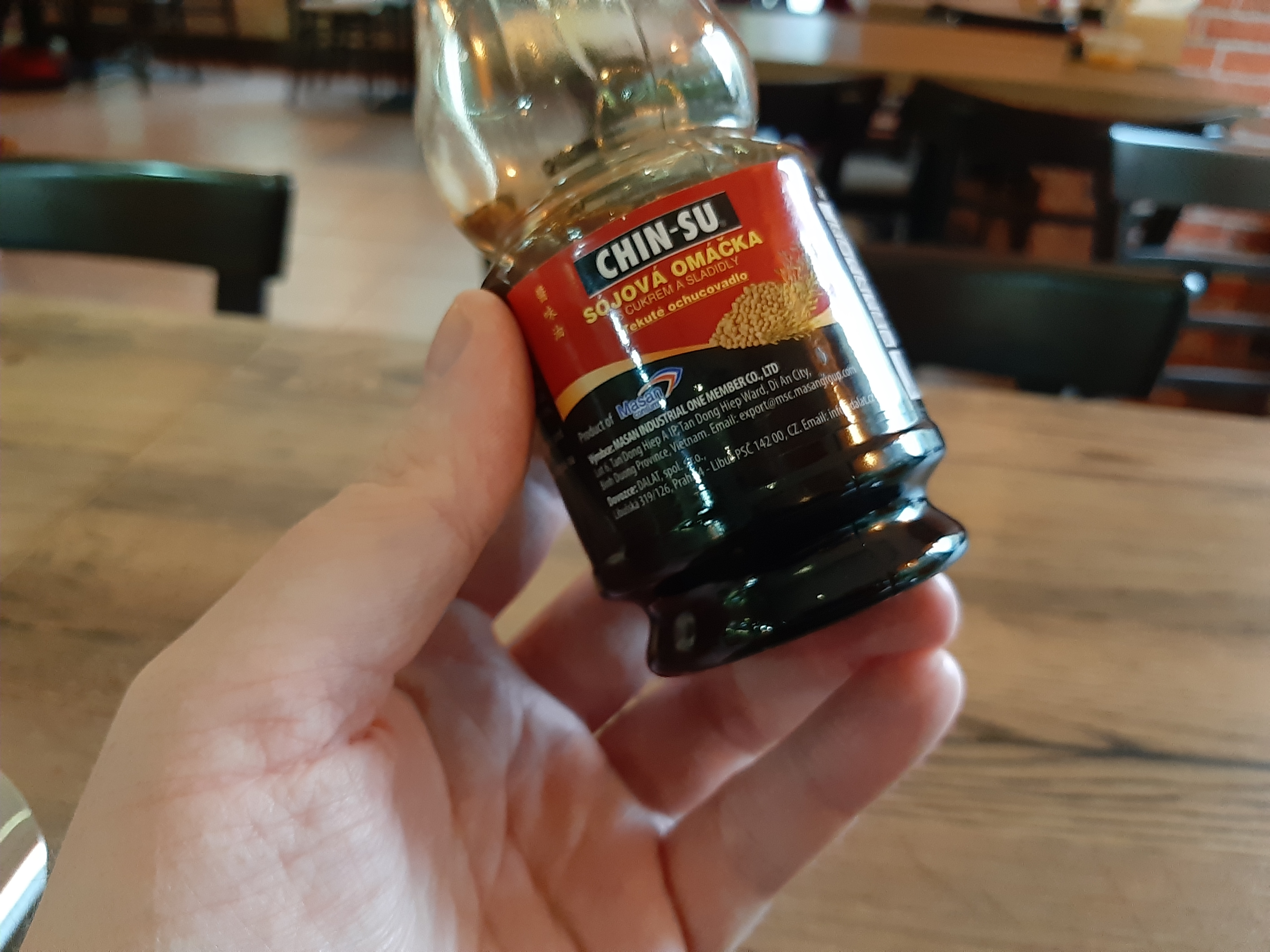
A bottle of xì dầu

=== Vietnamese ===
In Vietnam, Chinese-style soy sauce is called xì dầu (derived from the Cantonese name 豉油) or nước tương. The term "soy sauce" could also imply other condiments and soy bean paste with thick consistency known as tương. Both are used mostly as a seasoning or dipping sauce for a number of dishes. Vietnamese cuisine itself favors fish sauce in cooking, but nước tương has a clear presence in vegetarian cuisine and Buddhist cuisine.

== Nutrition ==
A study by the National University of Singapore showed that Chinese dark soy sauce contains 10 times the antioxidants of red wine. Unpasteurized soy sauce is rich in lactic acid bacteria and of excellent anti-allergic potential.

Soy sauce does not contain the level of isoflavones associated with other soy products, such as tofu or edamame. It can also be very salty, having a salt content between 14 and 18%. Low-sodium soy sauces are made, but it is difficult to make soy sauce without using some quantity of salt as an antimicrobial agent.

A serving of 100 millilitres (3.5 imp fl oz; 3.4 US fl oz) of soy sauce contains, according to the USDA:

- Energy : 60 kcal
- Fat: 0.1 g
- Carbohydrates: 5.57 g
- Fibers: 0.8 g
- Protein: 10.51 g
- Sodium: 6 g

=== Carcinogens ===
Soy sauce may contain ethyl carbamate, a Group 2A carcinogen.

In 2001, the United Kingdom Food Standards Agency found in testing various soy sauces manufactured in mainland China, Taiwan, Hong Kong, and Thailand (made from hydrolyzed soy protein, rather than being naturally fermented) that 22% of tested samples contained a chemical carcinogen named 3-MCPD (3-monochloropropane-1,2-diol) at levels considerably higher than those deemed safe by the EU. About two-thirds of these samples also contained a second carcinogenic chemical named 1,3-DCP (1,3-dichloropropane-2-ol) which experts advise should not be present at any levels in food. Both chemicals have the potential to cause cancer, and the Agency recommended that the affected products be withdrawn from shelves and avoided. The same carcinogens were found in soy sauces manufactured in Vietnam, causing a food scare in 2007.

In Canada, the Canadian Cancer Society writes,

Health Canada has concluded that there is no health risk to Canadians from use of available soy and oyster sauces. Because continuous lifetime exposure to high levels of 3-MCPD could pose a health risk, Health Canada has established 1.0 part per million (ppm) as a guideline for importers of these sauces, in order to reduce Canadians' long-term exposure to this chemical. This is considered to be a very safe level.

=== Allergies ===
Soy sauce allergy not caused by soy or wheat allergy is rare. Most varieties of soy sauce contain wheat, to which some people have a medical intolerance. However, protein hydrolysis (fermentation or industrial) breaks down gluten, so some soy sauces may end up tolerable to gluten-intolerant individuals with no detectable gluten left. Japanese tamari soy sauce is traditionally wheat-free, and some tamari available commercially today is wheat- and gluten-free.

Acid-hydrolyzed vegetable protein is non-allergenic due to the completeness of protein breakdown.

== See also ==
- List of Chinese sauces
- List of condiments
- List of fermented soy products
