= Isopropylthioxanthone =

Names
- Preferred IUPAC name 4-(Propan-2-yl)-9H-thioxanthen-9-one

Identifiers
CAS Number	83846-86-0
3D model (JSmol)	Interactive image
ChemSpider	139351
ECHA InfoCard	100.073.674
EC Number	281-065-4
PubChem CID	158403
UNII	PAF3CW7TJ8
CompTox Dashboard (EPA)	DTXSID80868761
- InChI: InChI=1S/C16H14OS/c1-10(2)11-7-5-8-13-15(17)12-6-3-4-9-14(12)18-16(11)13/h3-10H,1-2H3 Key: IKVYHNPVKUNCJM-UHFFFAOYSA-N; InChI=1/C16H14OS/c1-10(2)11-7-5-8-13-15(17)12-6-3-4-9-14(12)18-16(11)13/h3-10H,1-2H3 Key: IKVYHNPVKUNCJM-UHFFFAOYAM
- SMILES: CC(C)C1=CC=CC2=C1SC3=CC=CC=C3C2=O

Properties
Chemical formula	C_{16}H_{14}OS
Molar mass	254.35 g·mol^{−1}
- Except where otherwise noted, data are given for materials in their standard state (at 25 °C [77 °F], 100 kPa). verify (what is ?) Infobox references

Isopropylthioxanthone (ITX) is used as a photoinitiator in printing.

In 2005, traces of isopropyl thioxanthone were found by Italian authorities in babies milk produced by Nestlé.
