= Multi-Crop Passport Descriptor =

The Multi-Crop Passport Descriptor (MCPD) is an extension to the international standard to facilitate germplasm passport information exchange. MCPD was jointly developed by the International Board for Plant Genetic Resources (now Bioversity International) and the FAO. The Multi-Crop Passport Descriptor is intended to provide a standardised method of describing and exchanging information about plant genetic resources.

The Multi-Crop Passport Descriptor includes plant descriptors such as, including scientific name, common names, growth habit, reproductive type, and disease resistance. It also includes descriptors for morphological and agronomic traits, and genetic and cytogenetic characteristics. The Multi-Crop Passport Descriptor also includes information about the origin and distribution of the plant, and its current use and potential uses. The descriptors are compatible with Bioversity's crop descriptor lists, with the descriptors used by the FAO World Information and Early Warning System (WIEWS) on plant genetic resources (PGR), and the GENESYS global portal.
