= Genesys (website) =

Genesys is an online, global portal about plant genetic resources for food and agriculture. It is a gateway from which germplasm accessions from gene banks around the world can be easily found and ordered.

The project started in 2008 by Bioversity International, the Global Crop Diversity Trust and the Secretariat of the International Treaty on Plant Genetic Resources for Food and Agriculture, "to create a single information portal to facilitate the access to, and use of, accessions in ex situ gene banks".

In May 2011, the first version of the website was launched, containing 2.3 million accession records and some three million phenotypic records for 22 crops: bananas, barley, beans, breadfruit, cassava, chickpeas, coconuts, cowpeas, faba beans, finger millet, grass peas, lentils, maize, pearl millet, pigeon peas, potatoes, rice, sorghum, sweet potatoes, taro, wheat and yams. It brought together data from three major networks: the European Plant Genetic Resources Search Catalogue (EURISCO), System-Wide Information Network for Genetic Resources (SINGER) from CGIAR and the US Department of Agriculture's Germplasm Resources Information Network (GRIN).

In 2014, the second version of the website was launched. As of March 2015, the database listed 2.7 million accessions stored in 446 institutes from 252 countries. The source code, notably for the web server, is available online.

== See also ==
- International Treaty on Plant Genetic Resources for Food and Agriculture
