= 1,3-Dichloropropan-2-ol =

Names
- Preferred IUPAC name 1,3-Dichloropropan-2-ol
- Other names 1,3-Dichloropropanol-2; 1,3-Dichloroisopropyl alcohol; 1,3-Dichloro-2-propanol; 1,3-Dichloroisopropanol; Glycerol-α,γ-dichlorohydrin; α-Dichlorohydrin; 1,3-DCP; DC2P

Identifiers
CAS Number	96-23-1
3D model (JSmol)	Interactive image
ChEBI	CHEBI:18917
ChEMBL	ChEMBL468581
ChemSpider	21106535
ECHA InfoCard	100.002.266
EC Number	202-491-9
KEGG	C14399
PubChem CID	7289
RTECS number	UB1400000
UNII	0F4P2VQC07
UN number	2750
CompTox Dashboard (EPA)	DTXSID6025010
- InChI: InChI=1S/C3H6Cl2O/c4-1-3(6)2-5/h3,6H,1-2H2 Key: DEWLEGDTCGBNGU-UHFFFAOYSA-N
- SMILES: C(C(CCl)O)Cl

Properties
Chemical formula	C_{3}H_{6}Cl_{2}O
Molar mass	128.98 g·mol^{−1}
Appearance	Colorless liquid
Odor	Phenol-like
Density	1.39 g/cm^{3} (20 °C)
Melting point	−4 °C (25 °F; 269 K)
Boiling point	175 °C (347 °F; 448 K)
Solubility in water	110 g/L (20 °C)

Hazards
- GHS labelling
Pictograms	(GHS06: Toxic) (GHS07: Exclamation mark) (GHS08: Health hazard)
Signal word	Danger
Hazard statements	H301, H311, H312, H336, H350, H370, H373
Precautionary statements	P201, P202, P260, P264, P270, P271, P280, P281, P301+P310, P302+P352, P304+P340, P307+P311, P308+P313, P312, P314, P321, P322, P330, P361, P363, P403+P233, P405, P501
Flash point	74 °C (165 °F; 347 K)
- Lethal dose or concentration (LD, LC)
LD_{50} (median dose)	110 mg/kg (oral, rat); 1080 mg/kg (dermal, rabbit)
- Except where otherwise noted, data are given for materials in their standard state (at 25 °C [77 °F], 100 kPa). Infobox references

1,3-Dichloropropan-2-ol (1,3-DCP) is an organic compound with the formula HOCH_{2}CHClCH_{2}Cl. It is a colorless liquid. It is an intermediate in the production of epichlorohydrin.

1,3-DCP is a believed to be a carcinogen and mutagen. The International Agency for Research on Cancer classifies it as a Group 2B carcinogen ("possibly carcinogenic to humans").

Along with 3-monochloropropane-1,2-diol (3-MCPD), 1,3-DCP is found in some Asian style sauces such as soy sauce and oyster sauce.

== See also ==
- 1,3-Difluoropropan-2-ol
