= 2-MCPD =

Names
- Preferred IUPAC name 2-Chloropropane-1,3-diol
- Other names 2-monochloropropane-1,3-diol

Identifiers
CAS Number	497-04-1
3D model (JSmol)	Interactive image
ChemSpider	9913
ECHA InfoCard	100.007.123
EC Number	207-834-6
PubChem CID	10337
UNII	N6ZZ93MWJ4
CompTox Dashboard (EPA)	DTXSID7073191
- InChI: InChI=1S/C3H7ClO2/c4-3(1-5)2-6/h3,5-6H,1-2H2 Key: DYPJJAAKPQKWTM-UHFFFAOYSA-N
- SMILES: C(C(CO)Cl)O

Properties
Chemical formula	C_{3}H_{7}ClO_{2}
Molar mass	110.54 g·mol^{−1}
Appearance	colorless liquid
Boiling point	146 °C; 295 °F; 419 K 18 mmHg
- Except where otherwise noted, data are given for materials in their standard state (at 25 °C [77 °F], 100 kPa). Infobox references

2-MCPD (2-chloropropane-1,3-diol) is an organic chemical compound with the formula ClCH(CH_{2}(OH))_{2}. It is a colorless liquid. The compound has attracted notoreity as a food contaminant. Together with the 3-MCPD, it is one of two chloropropanols food contaminants. It is suspected to be carcinogenic in humans.

2-MCPD, together with its isomer 3-MCPD, is thought to be produced when fat-containing foods are treated at high temperatures with hydrochloric acid. Such treatments are sometimes used to accelerate protein hydrolysis, making food more digestable. In such a treatment chloride is thought to react with the glycerol backbone of lipids to produce 2- and 3-MCPD.
