= 2007 Vietnam food scare =

Food contamination event in Vietnam

The 2007 Vietnam food scare was a series of food scandal which exposed contaminated food. Among the issues were formaldehyde in noodles of the national dish, phở, banned pesticides in vegetables and fruit, and cancer-causing chemicals in soy sauce.
