= 3-MCPD =

- Skeletal formula

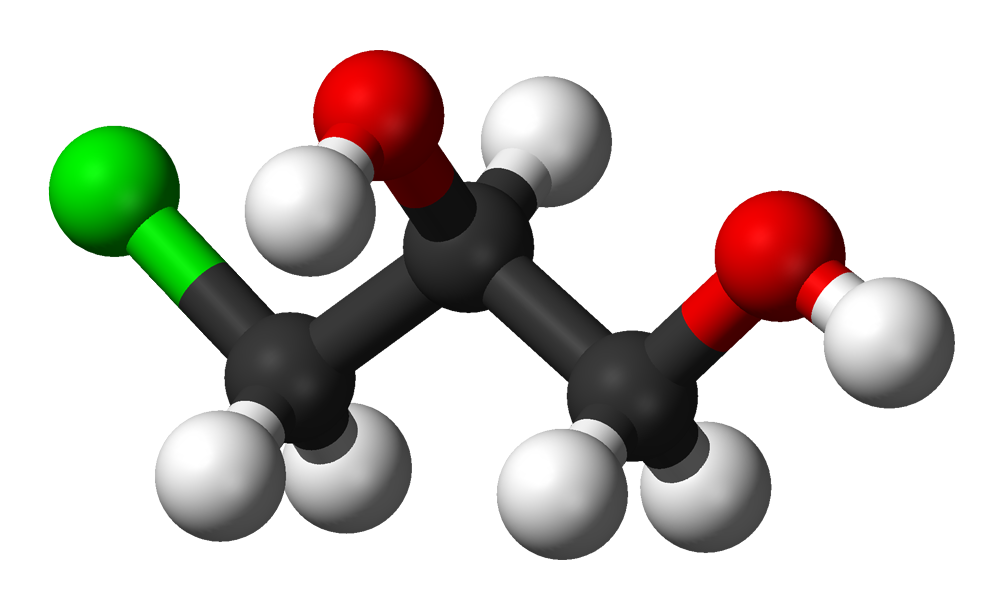
- Ball-and-stick model

Names
- Preferred IUPAC name 3-Chloropropane-1,2-diol
- Other names 3-Monochloropropane-1,2-diol; α-Chlorohydrin; Glycerol α-monochlorohydrin; Chlorodeoxyglycerol; 3-Chloro-1,2-propanediol

Identifiers
CAS Number	96-24-2
3D model (JSmol)	Interactive image
Beilstein Reference	635684
ChEBI	CHEBI:18721
ChEMBL	ChEMBL3185949
ChemSpider	7018
ECHA InfoCard	100.002.267
EC Number	202-492-4
Gmelin Reference	68752
KEGG	C18676
PubChem CID	7290
UNII	QGS78A3T6P
CompTox Dashboard (EPA)	DTXSID4020664
- InChI: InChI=1S/C3H7ClO2/c4-1-3(6)2-5/h3,5-6H,1-2H2 Key: SSZWWUDQMAHNAQ-UHFFFAOYSA-N; InChI=1/C3H7ClO2/c4-1-3(6)2-5/h3,5-6H,1-2H2 Key: SSZWWUDQMAHNAQ-UHFFFAOYAR
- SMILES: ClCC(O)CO

Properties
Chemical formula	C_{3}H_{7}ClO_{2}
Molar mass	110.54 g·mol^{−1}
Appearance	Viscous, colorless liquid
Density	1.32 g·cm^{−3}
Melting point	−40 °C (−40 °F; 233 K)
Boiling point	213 °C (415 °F; 486 K)

Hazards
- GHS labelling
Pictograms	(GHS05: Corrosive) (GHS06: Toxic) (GHS08: Health hazard)
Signal word	Danger
Hazard statements	H300, H312, H315, H318, H330, H351, H360, H370, H372
Precautionary statements	P201, P202, P260, P264, P270, P271, P280, P281, P284, P301+P310, P302+P352, P304+P340, P305+P351+P338, P307+P311, P308+P313, P310, P311, P312, P314, P320, P321, P330, P332+P313, P362, P363, P403+P233, P405, P501
Safety data sheet (SDS)	External MSDS
- Except where otherwise noted, data are given for materials in their standard state (at 25 °C [77 °F], 100 kPa). verify (what is ?) Infobox references

3-MCPD (3-monochloropropane-1,2-diol or 3-chloropropane-1,2-diol) is an organic chemical compound with the formula HOCH_{2}CH(OH)CH_{2}Cl. It is a colorless liquid. The compound has attracted notoreity as the most common member of chemical food contaminants known as chloropropanols. It is suspected to be carcinogenic in humans.

== Accidental and intentional production ==
3-MCPD, together with its isomer 2-MCPD, is thought to be produced when fat-containing foods are treated at high temperatures with hydrochloric acid. Such treatments are sometimes used to accelerate protein hydrolysis, making food more digestible. In such a treatment chloride is thought to react with the glycerol backbone of lipids to produce 3-MCPD and 2-MCPD. Chlorination of glycerol gives the 3-MCPD:

HOCH(CH_{2}OH)_{2} + HCl → HOCH(CH_{2}Cl)(CH_{2}OH) + H_{2}O

The same compound can be produced by hydrolysis of epichlorohydrin.

== Occurrence ==
In 2009, 3-MCPD was found in some East Asian and Southeast Asian sauces such as oyster sauce, Hoisin sauce, and soy sauce. Using hydrochloric acid is far faster than traditional slow fermentation. A 2013 European Food Safety Authority report indicated margarine, vegetable oils (excluding walnut oil), preserved meats, bread, and fine bakery wares as major sources in Europe.

3-MCPD can also be found in many paper products treated with polyamidoamine-epichlorohydrin wet-strength resins.

== Absorption and toxicity ==
The International Agency for Research on Cancer has classified 3-MCPD as Group 2B, "possibly carcinogenic to humans". 3-MCPD is carcinogenic in rodents via a non-genotoxic mechanism. It is able to cross the blood-testis barrier and blood–brain barrier. The oral LD_{50} of 3-chloro-1,2-propanediol is 152 mg/kg bodyweight in rats.

3-MCPD also has male antifertility effects and can be used as a rat chemosterilant.

== Legal limits ==
The joint Food Standards Australia New Zealand (FSANZ) set a limit for 3-MCPD in soy sauce of 0.02 mg/kg, in line with European Commission standards which came into force in the EU in April 2002.

== History ==
In 2000, a survey of soy sauces and similar products available in the UK was carried out by the Joint Ministry of Agriculture, Fisheries and Food/Department of Health Food Safety and Standards Group (JFSSG) and reported more than half of the samples collected from retail outlets contained various levels of 3-MCPD.

In 2001, the United Kingdom Food Standards Agency (FSA) found in tests of various oyster sauces and soy sauces that 22% of samples contained 3-MCPD at levels considerably higher than those deemed safe by the European Union. About two-thirds of these samples also contained a second chloropropanol called 1,3-dichloropropane-2-ol (1,3-DCP) which experts advise should not be present at any levels in food. Both chemicals have the potential to cause cancer and the Agency recommended that the affected products be withdrawn from shelves and avoided.

In 2001, the FSA and Food Standards Australia New Zealand (FSANZ) singled out brands and products imported from Thailand, China, Hong Kong, and Taiwan. Brands named in the British warning include Golden Mountain, King Imperial, Pearl River Bridge, Golden Mark, Kimlan, Golden Swan, Sinsin, Tung Chun, and Wanjasham soy sauce. Knorr soy sauce was also implicated, as well as Uni-President Enterprises Corporation creamy soy sauce from Taiwan, Silver Swan soy sauce from the Philippines, Ta Tun soy bean sauce from Taiwan, Tau Vi Yeu seasoning sauce and Soya bean sauce from Vietnam, Zu Miao Fo Shan soy superior sauce and Mushroom soy sauce from China and Golden Mountain and Lee Kum Kee chicken marinade. Between 2002 and 2004, relatively high levels of 3-MCPD and other chloropropanols were found in soy sauce and other foods in China.

In 2007, in Vietnam, 3-MCPD was found in toxic levels. In 2004, the HCM City Institute of Hygiene and Public Health found 33 of 41 sample of soy sauce with high rates of 3-MCPD, including six samples with up to 11,000 to 18,000 times more 3-MPCD than permitted, an increase over 23 to 5,644 times in 2001. The newspaper Thanh Nien Daily commented, "Health agencies have known that Vietnamese soy sauce, the country's second most popular sauce after fish sauce, has been chock full of cancer agents since at least 2001."

In March 2008, in Australia, "carcinogens" were found in soy sauces, and Australians were advised to avoid soy sauce.

In November 2008, Britain's Food Standards Agency reported a wide range of household name food products from sliced bread to crackers, beefburgers and cheese with 3-MCPD above safe limits. Relatively high levels of the chemical were found in popular brands such as Mother's Pride, Jacobs crackers, John West, Kraft Dairylea and McVitie's Krackawheat. The same study also found relatively high levels in a range of supermarket own-brands, including Tesco char-grilled beefburgers, Sainsbury's Hot 'n Spicy Chicken Drumsticks and digestive biscuits from Asda. The highest levels of 3-MCPD found in a non- soy sauce product, crackers, was 134μg/kg. The highest level of 3-MCPD found in soy sauce was 93,000μg/kg, 700 times higher.

In 2006 the legal limit for 3-MCPD contained in acid-hydrolysed vegetable protein (HVP) and soy sauce was set at 20μg/kg, the legislation was revised further in 2020 to limit the amount of 3-MCPD across all vegetable oils and fats as well as oils made from marine life which are either produced and made available for consumers or added as an ingredient to other foods.

In 2016, the occurrence of 3-MCPD in selected paper products (coffee filters, tea bags, disposable paper hot beverage cups, milk paperboard containers, paper towels) sold on the Canadian and German market was reported and the transfer of 3-MCPD from those products to beverages was investigated. Exposure to 3-MCPD from packaging material would likely constitute only a small percentage of overall dietary exposure when compared to the intake of processed oils/fats containing 3-MCPD equivalent (in form of fatty acid esters) which are often present at levels of about 0.2-2μg/g.

== Other uses ==
- 3-MCPD is a versatile multifunctional building block.
