= 2010 (disambiguation) =

2010 was a common year starting on Friday of the Gregorian calendar.

2010 may also refer to:

- 2010s, the decade
- 2010 FIFA World Cup, the 19th FIFA World Cup, the world championship for men's national association football teams
- 2010 Winter Olympics, February Winter Olympics that was held in Vancouver, BC
- 2010: Odyssey Two, a 1982 science fiction novel by Arthur C. Clarke
  - 2010: The Year We Make Contact, a science fiction film released in 1984 directed by Peter Hyams based on the novel
- 2010 (Stargate SG-1), an episode of Stargate SG-1
- 2010 Lost Edition, an album by the award-winning reggaeton duo Wisin & Yandel
- 2010 Biodiversity Target, conservation targets aiming to reduce biodiversity loss by the end of the year 2010
  - 2010 Biodiversity Indicators Partnership, an organization working toward the target
- 2010 (Li-Ron Choir album), 2011
- Twenty Ten (album), a 2010 album by Guy Sebastian
