= Biodiversity action plan =

Program about threatened species and habitats

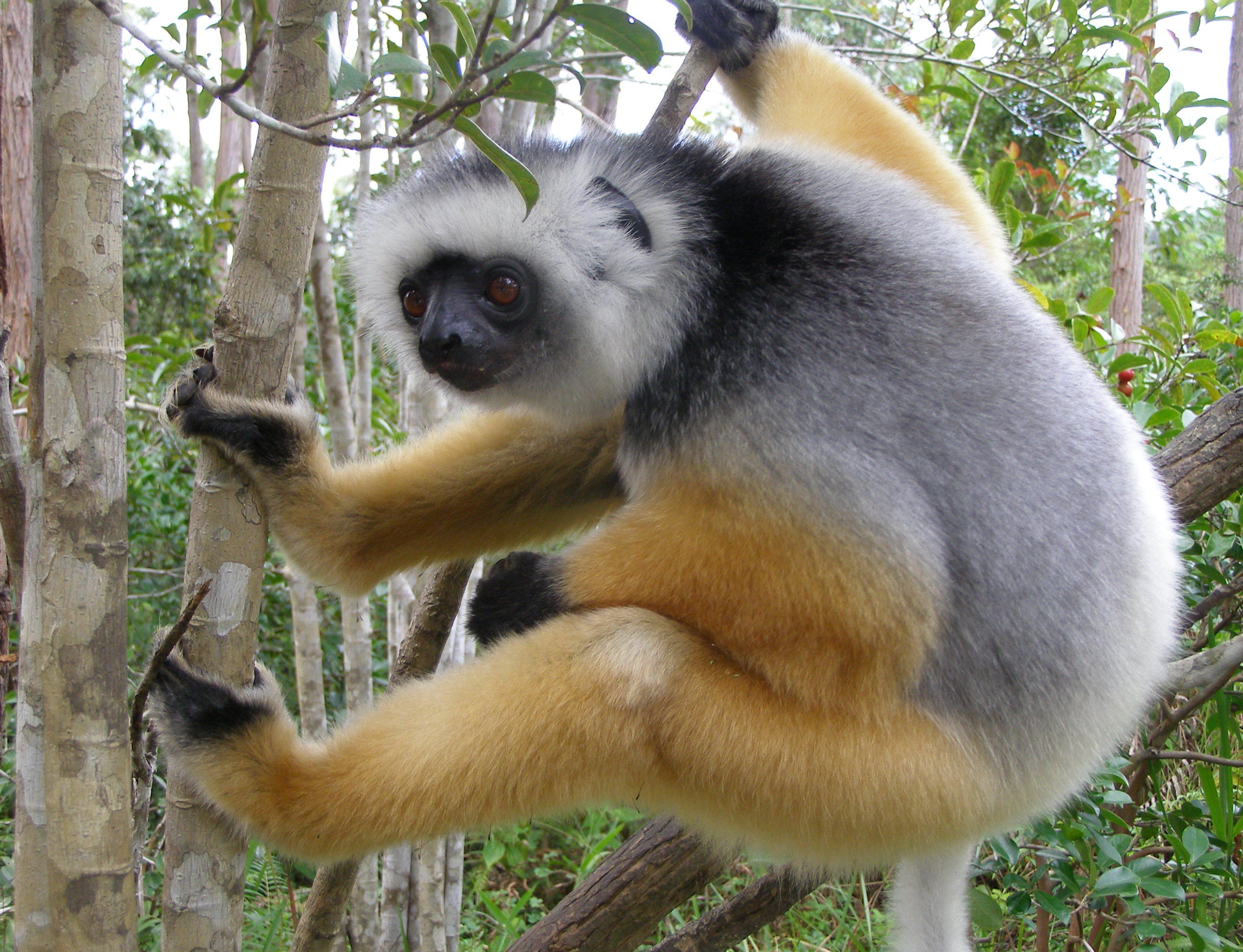
Diademed sifaka, an endangered primate of Madagascar

A biodiversity action plan (BAP) is an internationally recognized program aimed at protecting and restoring threatened species and habitats, and at strengthening the resilience of biological systems. The concept emerged from the 1992 Convention on Biological Diversity (CBD), which called on participating nations to develop strategies for conserving biodiversity. As of 2009, 191 countries had ratified the CBD, although only a portion of them had produced comprehensive BAP documents.

The core components of a typical BAP include: (a) compiling inventories of biological data for selected species or habitats; (b) assessing the conservation status of species within defined ecosystems; (c) setting clear targets for conservation and restoration; and (d) developing budgets, timelines, and institutional partnerships for implementation.

== Types ==
=== Species plans ===
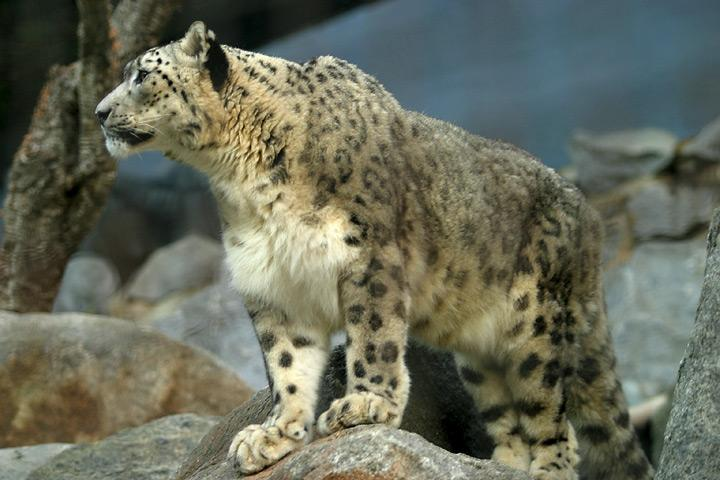
Snow leopard, Pakistan, an endangered species

A fundamental method of engagement to a BAP is thorough documentation regarding individual species, with emphasis upon the population distribution and conservation status. This task, while fundamental, is highly daunting, since only an estimated ten percent of the world's species are believed to have been characterized as of 2006, most of these unknowns being fungi, invertebrate animals, micro-organisms and plants. For many bird, mammal and reptile species, information is often available in published literature; however, for fungi, invertebrate animals, micro-organisms and many plants, such information may require considerable local data collection. It is also useful to compile time trends of population estimates in order to understand the dynamics of population variability and vulnerability. In some parts of the world complete species inventories are not realistic; for example, in the Madagascar dry deciduous forests, many species are completely undocumented and much of the region has never even been systematically explored by scientists.

A species plan component of a country's BAP should ideally entail a thorough description of the range, habitat, behaviour, breeding and interaction with other species. Once a determination has been made of conservation status (e.g. rare, endangered, threatened, vulnerable), a plan can then be created to conserve and restore the species population to target levels. Examples of programmatic protection elements are: habitat restoration; protection of habitat from urban development; establishment of property ownership; limitations on grazing or other agricultural encroachment into habitat; reduction of slash-and-burn agricultural practises; outlawing killing or collecting the species; restrictions on pesticide use; and control of other environmental pollution. The plan should also articulate which public and private agencies should implement the protection strategy and indicate budgets available to execute this strategy.

=== Agricultural plans ===
Agricultural practices can reduce the biodiversity of a region significantly. Biodiversity Action Plans for agricultural production are necessary to ensure biodiversity friendly production. It has not been common for companies to integrate biodiversity aspects into their value chain, but some companies and organizations have shown overall efforts for implementing better practices.

An existing example for guidelines on biodiversity practices in agriculture is the Biodiversity Action Plan for spice production in India. By planning and implementing biodiversity friendly measures, farmers can mitigate negative impacts and support positive influences.

=== Habitat plans ===
Where a number of threatened species depend upon a specific habitat, it may be appropriate to prepare a habitat protection element of the Biodiversity Action Plan. Examples of such special habitats are: raised acidic bogs of Scotland; Waterberg Biosphere bushveld in South Africa; California's coastal wetlands; and Sweden's Stora Alvaret on the island of Öland. In this case also, careful inventories of species and also the geographic extent and quality of the habitat must be documented. Then, as with species plans, a program can be created to protect, enhance and/or restore habitat using similar strategies as discussed above under the species plans.

== Specific countries and regions ==
Some examples of individual countries which have produced substantive Biodiversity Action Plans follow. In every example the plans concentrate on plants and vertebrate animals, with very little attention to neglected groups such as fungi, invertebrate animals and micro-organisms, even though these are also part of biodiversity. Preparation of a country BAP may cost up to 100 million pounds sterling, with annual maintenance costs roughly ten percent of the initial cost. If plans took into account neglected groups, the cost would be higher. Obviously costs for countries with small geographical area or simplified ecosystems have a much lesser cost. For example, the St. Lucia BAP has been costed in the area of several million pounds sterling.

=== Australia ===
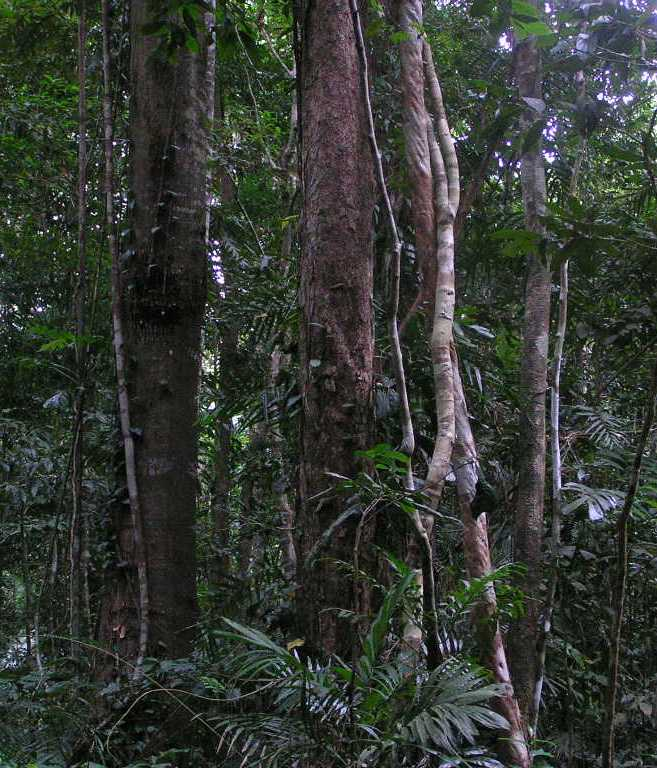
The Daintree Rainforest in Queensland, Australia

Australia has developed a detailed and rigorous Biodiversity Action Plan. This document estimates that the total number of indigenous species may be 560,000, many of which are endemic. A key element of the BAP is protection of the Great Barrier Reef, which is actually in a much higher state of health than most of the world's reefs, Australia having one of the highest percentages of treated wastewater. There are however serious ongoing concerns, particularly in regards to the ongoing negative impact on water quality from land use practices. Also, climate change impact is feared to be significant.

Considerable analysis has been conducted on the sustainable yield of firewood production, a major threat to deforestation in most tropical countries. Biological inventory work; assessment of harvesting practices; and computer modeling of the dynamics of treefall, rot and harvest; have been carried out to adduce data on safe harvesting rates. Extensive research has also been conducted on the relation of brush clearance to biodiversity decline and impact on water tables; for example, these effects have been analyzed in the Toolibin Lake wetlands region.

=== European Union ===
In May 2011, the European Commission adopted a new strategy to halt the loss of biodiversity and ecosystem services in the EU by 2020, in line with the commitments made at the 10th meeting of the Convention on Biological Diversity (CBD) held in Nagoya, Japan in 2010.

=== New Zealand ===
New Zealand has ratified the Convention on Biological Diversity and as part of The New Zealand Biodiversity Strategy and Biodiversity Action Plans are implemented on ten separate themes.

Local government and some companies also have their own Biodiversity Action Plan.

=== St. Lucia ===
The St. Lucia BAP recognizes impacts of large numbers of tourists to the marine and coastal diversity of the Soufrière area of the country. The BAP specifically acknowledges that the carrying capacity for human use and water pollution discharge of sensitive reef areas was exceeded by the year 1990. The plan also addresses conservation of the historic island fishing industry. In 1992, several institutions in conjunction with native fishermen to produce a sustainable management plan for fishery resources, embodied in the Soufrière Marine Management Area.

The St. Lucia BAP features significant involvement from the University of the West Indies. Specific detailed attention is given to three species of threatened marine turtles, to a variety of vulnerable birds and a number of pelagic fishes and cetaceans. In terms of habitat conservation the plan focusses attention on the biologically productive mangrove swamps and notes that virtually all mangrove areas had already come under national protection by 1984.

=== Tanzania ===
The Tanzania national BAP addresses issues related to sustainable use of Lake Manyara, an extensive freshwater lake, whose usage by humans accelerated in the period 1950 to 1990. The designation of the Lake Manyara Biosphere Reserve under UNESCO's Man and the Biosphere Programme in 1981 combines conservation of the lake and surrounding high value forests with sustainable use of the wetlands area and simple agriculture. This BAP has united principal lake users in establishing management targets. The biosphere reserve has induced sustainable management of the wetlands, including monitoring groundwater and the chemistry of the escarpment water source.

=== United Kingdom ===
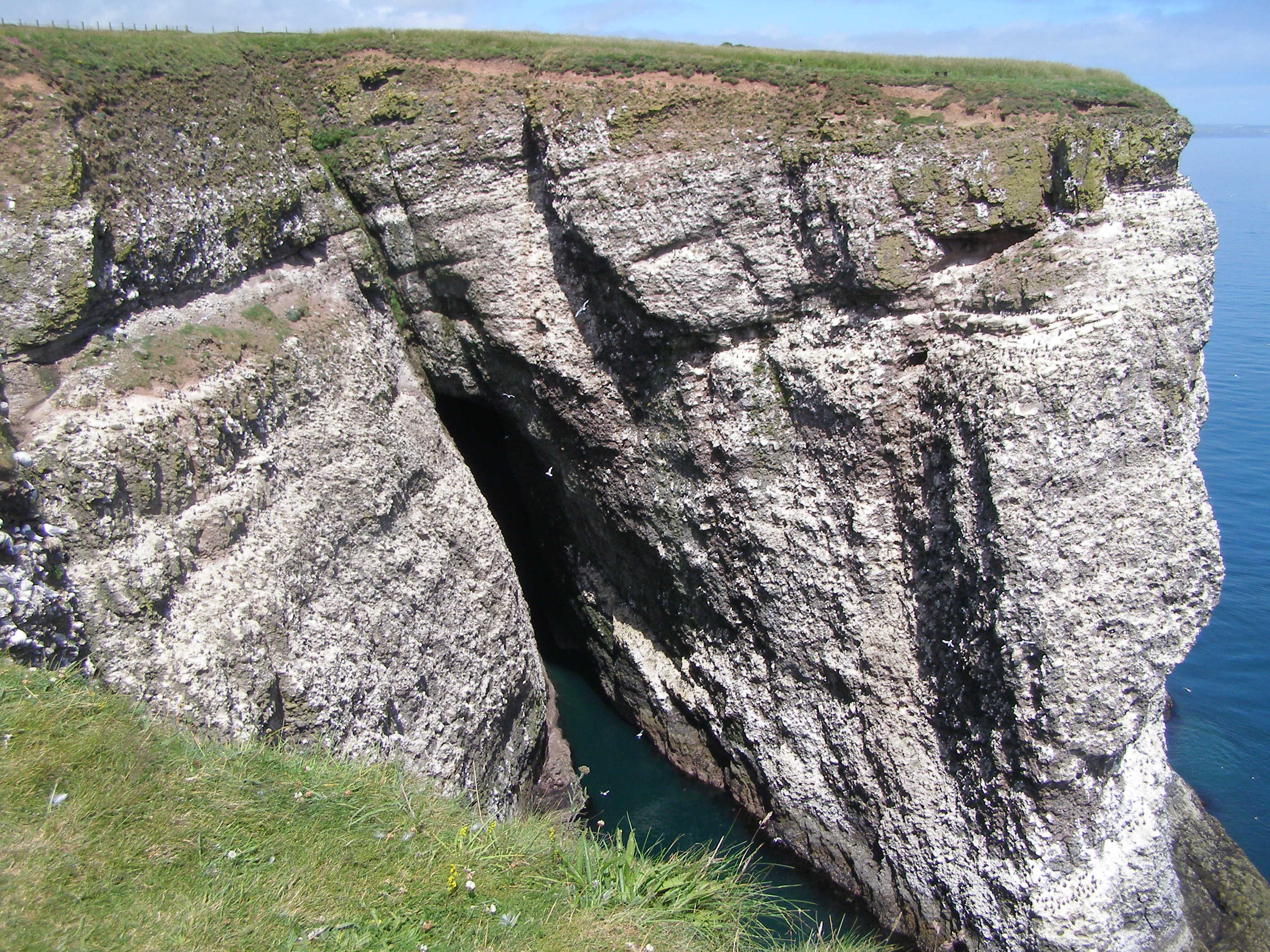
Fowlsheugh cliffs, Scotland, a protected seabird breeding habitat

The United Kingdom Biodiversity Action Plan covers not only terrestrial species associated with lands within the UK, but also marine species and migratory birds, which spend a limited time in the UK or its offshore waters. The UK plan encompasses "391 Species Action Plans, 45 Habitat Action Plans and 162 Local Biodiversity Action Plans with targeted actions". This plan is noteworthy because of its extensive detail, clarity of endangerment mechanisms, specificity of actions, follow up monitoring program and its inclusion of migrating cetaceans and pelagic birds.

On August 28, 2007, the new Biodiversity Action Plan (BAP) [launched in 1997] identified 1,149 species and 65 habitats in the UK that needed conservation and greater protection. The updated list included the hedgehog, house sparrow, grass snake and the garden tiger moth, while otters, bottlenose dolphins and red squirrels remained in need of habitat protection.

In 2012 the UK BAP was succeeded by the 'UK Post-2010 Biodiversity Framework'.

==== UK BAP website ====
To support the work of the UK BAP, the UK BAP website was created by the Joint Nature Conservation Committee (JNCC) in 2001. The website contained information on the BAP process, hosted all relevant documents, and provided news and relevant updates. In March 2011, as part of the UK government's review of websites, the UK BAP site was 'closed', and the core content was migrated onto the JNCC's own website. Content from the original UK BAP website has been archived by the National Archives as snapshots from various dates (for example, UK BAP: copy March 2011; copy 2012).

=== United States ===
Twenty-six years prior to the international biodiversity convention, the United States had launched a national program to protect threatened species in the form of the 1966 Endangered Species Act. The legislation created broad authority for analyzing and listing species of concern, and mandated that Species Recovery Plans be created. Thus, while the USA is an unratified signer of the accord, arguably it has the longest track record and most comprehensive program of species protection of any country. There are about 7000 listed species (e.g. endangered or threatened), of which about half have approved Recovery Plans. While this number of species seems high compared to other countries, the value is rather indicative of the total number of species characterized, which is extremely large.

=== Uzbekistan ===
Five major divisions of habitat have been identified in Uzbekistan’s BAP: Wetlands (including reed habitat and man-made marsh); desert ecosystems (including sandy, stony and clay); steppes; riparian ecosystems; and mountain ecosystems. Over 27,000 species have been inventoried in the country, with a high rate of endemism for fishes and reptiles. Principal threats to biodiversity are related to human activities associated with overpopulation and generally related to agricultural intensification. Major geographic regions encompassed by the BAP include the Aral Sea Programme (threatened by long-term drainage and salination, largely for cotton production), the Nuratau Biosphere Reserve, and the Western Tien Shan Mountains Programme (in conjunction with Kazakhstan and Kyrgyzstan).

== Criticism ==
Some developing countries criticize the emphasis of BAPs, because these plans inherently favour consideration of wildlife protection above food and industrial production, and in some cases may represent an obstacle to population growth. The plans are costly to produce, a fact which makes it difficult for many smaller countries and poorer countries to comply. In terms of the plans themselves, many countries have adopted pro-forma plans including little research and even less in the way of natural resource management. Almost universally, this has resulted in plans which emphasize plants and vertebrate animals, and which overlook fungi, invertebrate animals and micro-organisms. With regard to specific world regions, there is a notable lack of substantive participation by most of the Middle Eastern countries and much of Africa, the latter of which may be impeded by economic considerations of plan preparation. Some governments such as the European Union have diverted the purpose of a biodiversity action plan, and implemented the convention accord by a set of economic development policies with referencing certain ecosystems' protection.

== Biodiversity planning: a new way of thinking ==
The definition of biodiversity under the Convention on Biological Diversity now recognises that biodiversity is a combination of ecosystem structure and function, as much as its components e.g. species, habitats and genetic resources. Article 2 states:

in addressing the boundless complexity of biological diversity, it has become conventional to think in hierarchical terms, from the genetic material within individual cells, building up through individual organisms, populations, species and communities of species, to the biosphere overall...At the same time, in seeking to make management intervention as efficient as possible, it is essential to take an holistic view of biodiversity and address the interactions that species have with each other and their non-living environment, i.e. to work from an ecological perspective.

The World Summit on Sustainable Development endorsed the objectives of the Convention on Biological Diversity to “achieve by 2010 a significant reduction of the current rate of biodiversity loss at the global, regional and national level as a contribution to poverty alleviation and to the benefit of life on Earth”. To achieve this outcome, biodiversity management will depend on maintaining structure and function.

Biodiversity is not singularly definable but may be understood via a series of management principles under BAPs, such as:

1. that biodiversity is conserved across all levels and scales – structure, function and composition are conserved at site, regional, state and national scales. 2. that examples of all ecological communities are adequately managed for conservation. 3. ecological communities are managed to support and enhance viable populations of animals, fungi, micro-organisms and plants and ecological functions.

Biodiversity and wildlife are not the same thing. The traditional focus on threatened species in BAPs is at odds with the principles of biodiversity management because, by the time species become threatened, the processes that maintain biodiversity are already compromised. Individual species are also regarded as generally poor indicators of biodiversity when it comes to actual planning. A species approach to BAPs only serves to identify and at best, apply a patch to existing problems. Increasingly, biodiversity planners are looking through the lens of ecosystem services. Critics of biodiversity are often confusing the need to protect species (their intrinsic value) with the need to maintain ecosystem processes, which ultimately maintain human society and do not compromise economic development. Hence, a core principle of biodiversity management, that traditional BAPs overlook, is the need to incorporate cultural, social and economic values in the process.

Modern day BAPs use an analysis of ecosystem services, key ecological process drivers, and use species as one of many indicators of change. They would seek to maintain structure and function by addressing habitat connectivity and resilience and may look at communities of species (threatened or otherwise) as one method of monitoring outcomes. Ultimately, species are the litmus test for biodiversity – viable populations of species can only be expected to exist in relatively intact habitats. However, the rationale behind BAPs is to "conserve and restore" biodiversity. One of the fastest developing areas of management is biodiversity offsets. The principles are in keeping with ecological impact assessment, which in turn depends on good quality BAPs for evaluation. Contemporary principles of biodiversity management, such as those produced by the Business Biodiversity Offsets Program are now integral to any plans to manage biodiversity, including the development of BAPs.

== See also ==
- 2010 Biodiversity Target
- 2010 Biodiversity Indicators Partnership
- Holocene extinction event
- Climate Action Plan
- IUCN Red List
- Regional Red List
