= Maya ICBG bioprospecting controversy =

The Maya ICBG bioprospecting controversy took place in 1999–2000, when the International Cooperative Biodiversity Group led by ethnobiologist Dr. Brent Berlin was accused of engaging in unethical forms of bioprospecting (biopiracy) by several NGOs and indigenous organizations. The ICBG had as its aim to document the biodiversity of Chiapas, Mexico and the ethnobotanical knowledge of the indigenous Maya people – to ascertain whether there were possibilities of developing medical products based on any of the plants used by the indigenous groups.

While the project had taken many precautions to act ethically in its dealings with the indigenous groups, the project became subject to severe criticisms of the methods used to attain prior informed consent. Among other things critics argued that the project had not devised a strategy for achieving informed consent from the entire community to which they argued the ethnobotanical knowledge belonged, and whom they argued would be affected by its commercialization. The project's directors argued that the knowledge was properly to be considered part of the public domain and therefore open to commercialization, and they argued that they had followed established best practice of ethical conduct in research to the letter. After a public discussion carried out in the media and on internet listservers the project's partners pulled out, and the ICBG was closed down in 2001, two years into its five years of allotted funding.

The Maya ICBG case was among the first to draw attention to the problems of distinguishing between benign forms of bioprospecting and unethical biopiracy, and to the difficulties of securing community participation and prior informed consent for would-be bioprospectors.

== Events ==
=== Background ===
In 1993, the National Institute of Health, National Science Foundation and USAID established the International Cooperative Biodiversity Group (ICBG) program to promote collaborative research on biodiversity between American universities and research institutions in countries that harbor unique genetic resources in the form of biodiversity. The basic aim of the program was to benefit both the host community and the global scientific community by discovering and researching the possibilities for new solutions to human health problems based on previously unexplored genetic resources. It therefore, seeks to conserve biodiversity, and to foment, encourage and support sustainable practices of usage of biological resources in the Global South. Projects would be initiated by principal investigators who would apply for a five-year period of funding, and who would establish the terms of the collaboration.

=== Maya ICBG ===
In 1998, the renowned ethnobotanist Brent Berlin and his wife, Dr. Eloise A. Berlin, founded an International Cooperative Biodiversity Group – the Maya ICGB.

The group was intended as a combined bioprospecting and research cooperative between the University of Georgia where the Berlins were employed, the ECOSUR (a university in Chiapas), a small Welsh pharmaceutical company called Molecular Nature ltd., and a newly created NGO called PROMAYA supposed to represent the Indigenous Maya of Chiapas. The two primary investigators had worked for more than 40 years documenting and describing the ethnobotany and medicinal knowledge of the Tzeltal Maya of the Chiapas region.

The aim of the project was to collect and document the ethnobotanical knowledge of the Maya people of Chiapas, one of the world's biodiversity hotspots.

=== PROMAYA ===
The NGO PROMAYA was established as a foundation that could receive a percentage of the profits from any marketable products resulting from the research, as well as exercise rights over the uses to which the indigenous knowledge would be put. As such, PROMAYA represented the project's will to comply with valid ethical standards and share rights and benefits with the original holders of the medicinal knowledge. Berlin began the NGO by contributing $30,000, money he had personally received as an award for his research. The benefit share agreement on any profits derived from the project allotted the majority to the Welsh pharmaceutical company, about 12–15 percent to the University of Georgia and 2–5% to the PROMAYA NGO. The plan was that Maya communities could then petition for grants from the NGO, to be used for community development.

=== Information campaign ===
The project began with an information campaign directed at the Maya communities with which they wished to cooperate. Using the medium of theater they presented the aims and goals of the project to the Maya. The information step was a vital part of the project's attempt to obtain prior informed consent from members of the participating communities. The project made the deliberate decision not to include information about the possibility that profits would eventually be made from the knowledge collected, or information on how any potential benefits would be divided among them, surmising that the chance of this happening was so slim that it would be a better strategy to introduce this issue when and if it were to arise. This decision would later be an important point of criticism by activists claiming that prior informed consent had not been obtained.

=== The controversy ===
Soon after being initiated, the project became the subject of harsh criticisms by indigenous activists and Mexican intellectuals who questioned how knowledge obtained from individual Maya could be patented by researchers or foreign pharmaceutical companies, how the PROMAYA NGO established by the Berlins and under their control could be considered representative of the many different Maya communities in Chiapas, and how it was possible for the knowledge that had been the collective property of the Maya peoples to become suddenly privatized without the prior consent of each of the individual initial holders of the knowledge. Among the most vocal opponents of the project were RAFI, a Canadian NGO, and COMPITCH an organization of indigenous healers. Much of the criticism was circulated on listservers and on internet fora.

The Berlins argued that the establishment of the NGO was the only feasible way of managing benefit sharing with the community and of obtaining prior informed consent, and that since the traditional knowledge was in the public domain among the Maya no individual Maya could expect remuneration. As tensions mounted, the Mexican partner UNAM withdrew its support for the project, and later the NIH, causing the project to be closed down in 2001 – without having been able to produce any results.

== Significance ==
No one seriously doubted that Berlin and the ICBG had the best intentions of ethical conduct, nonetheless, there remain serious criticisms of the way in which the project was planned and carried out, and the assumptions on which the project was based have been characterized as naïve. The Maya ICBG case was among the first to draw attention to the problems of distinguishing between bioprospecting and biopiracy, and to the difficulties of securing community participation and prior informed consent for bioprospectors.

== See also ==
- Hoodia (A famous case of ethical complications of bioprospecting in South Africa)
- Convention on Biological Diversity (UN convention on ethics of bioprospecting, not ratified by the US)
