= Children's Songs =

Children's songs are songs for children, which may include nursery rhymes set to music, songs that children invent and share among themselves, or modern creations intended for education or entertainment.

Children's songs may also refer to:

- Children's Songs (Chick Corea album), 1984
- Children's Songs (Li-Ron Choir album), 2012
- 6 Children's Songs, Op.66 (1914) by Alexander Gretchaninov
- Six voice and piano songs by Muriel Herbert (1897–1984):
  - "Children's Song 1: Merry-go-round" (Ada Harrison) [1938]
  - "Children's Song 2: The Gypsies" (Ada Harrison) [1938]
  - "Children's Song 3: The Tadpole" (Ada Harrison) [1938]
  - "Children's Song 4: Jack Spratt" (Ada Harrison) [1938]
  - "Children's Song 5: Acorn and Willow" (Ada Harrison) [1938]
  - "Children's Song 6: The Bunny" (Ada Harrison) [1938]

== See also ==
- Children's music, a genre of music for children
- Two songs for children, a list of compositions by Frederick Delius
