= Bad words =

Bad word or bad words may refer to:

- Bad word, a euphemism for profanity
- Bad Words (film), a 2013 American film
- "Bad Words", a 2004 episode of CSI: Crime Scene Investigation
- "Bad Word", an episode of American sitcom According to Jim
- "Bad Words", a track on the 2012 album Children's Songs by Israeli Li-Ron Choir
- "Bad Words", a track on the 2015 album Goon by Canadian Tobias Jesso Jr.
- "Bad Words", a track on the 1983 album Golden Shower of Hits by American band Circle Jerks
- "A Bad Word", a chapter in the 1995 children's book Wayside School Gets A Little Stranger
- "The Bad Word", an episode of the American sitcom Delta
- "The Bad Word", episode 51 of Yoko! Jakamoko! Toto!, a British children's TV series
