= International Day for Biological Diversity =

Day for the promotion of biodiversity

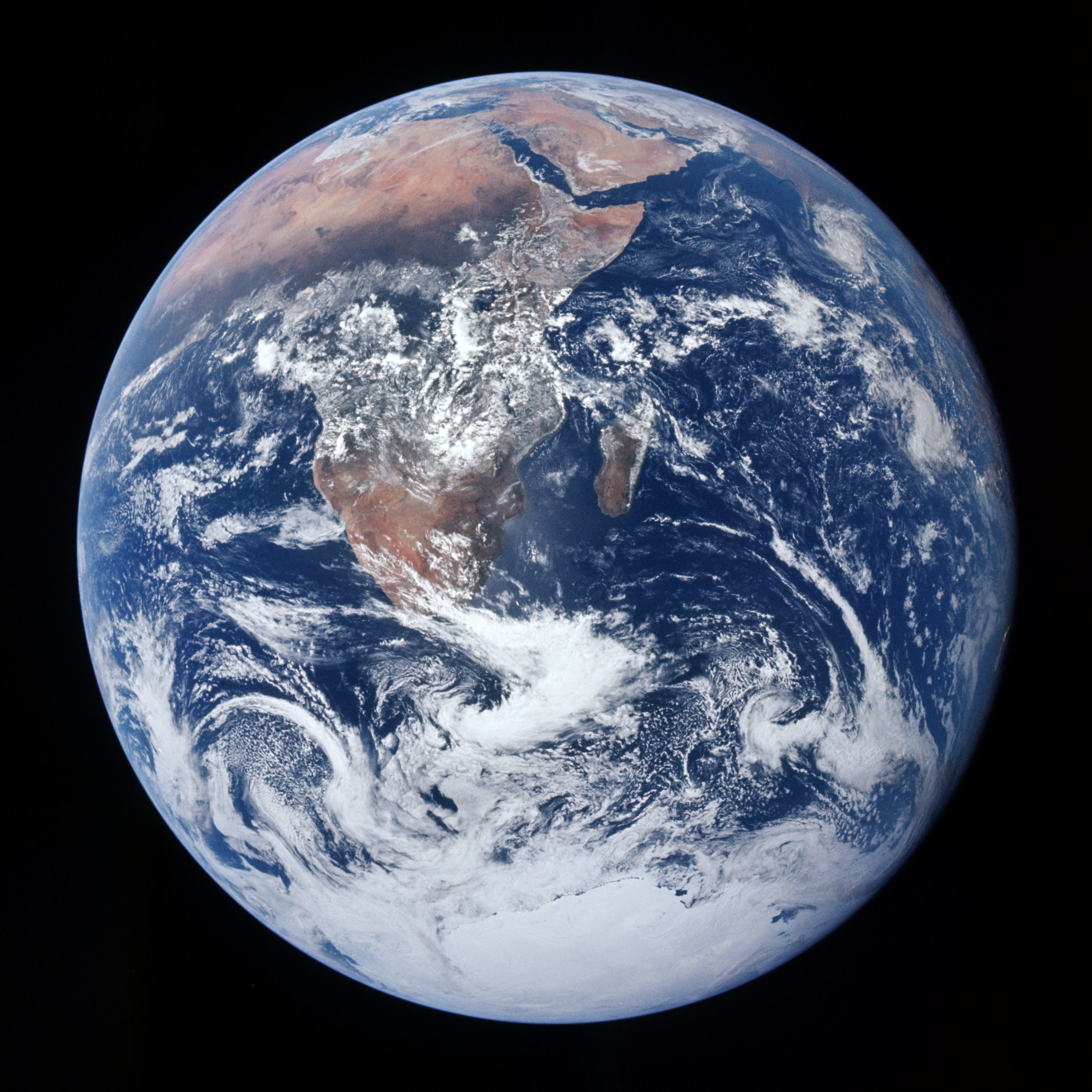
The Earth seen from Apollo 17. The first International Day for Biological Diversity was celebrated 28 years after the mission.

The International Day for Biological Diversity (or World Biodiversity Day) is a United Nations–sanctioned international day for the promotion of biodiversity issues. It is currently held on May 22.

The International Day for Biological Diversity falls within the scope of the UN Post-2015 Development Agenda's Sustainable Development Goals. In this larger initiative of international cooperation, the topic of biodiversity concerns stakeholders in sustainable agriculture; desertification, land degradation and drought; water and sanitation; health and sustainable development; energy; science, technology and innovation, knowledge-sharing and capacity-building; urban resilience and adaptation; sustainable transport; climate change and disaster risk reduction; oceans and seas; forests; vulnerable groups including indigenous peoples; and food security. The critical role of biodiversity in sustainable development was recognized in a Rio+20 outcome document, “The World We Want: A Future for All”.

From its creation by the Second Committee of the UN General Assembly in 1993 until 2000, it was held on December 29 to celebrate the day the Convention on Biological Diversity went into effect. On December 20, 2000, the date was shifted to commemorate the adoption of the Convention on May 22, 1992, at the Rio de Janeiro Earth Summit, and partly to avoid the many other holidays that occur in late December.

== Themes ==
Year	Themes
2000	Dedicated to forest biodiversity
2003	Biodiversity and poverty alleviation – challenges for sustainable development
2004	Biodiversity: Food, Water and Health for All
2005	Biodiversity: Life Insurance for our Changing World
2006	Protect Biodiversity in Drylands
2007	Biodiversity and Climate Change
2008	Biodiversity and Agriculture
2009	Invasive Alien Species
2010	Biodiversity, Development and poverty reduction
2011	Forest Biodiversity
2012	Marine Biodiversity
2013	Water and Biodiversity
2014	Island Biodiversity
2015	Convention on Biological Diversity
2016	Mainstreaming Biodiversity; Sustaining People and their Livelihoods
2017	Biodiversity and Sustainable Tourism
2018	Celebrating 25 Years of Action for Biodiversity
2019	Our Biodiversity, Our Food, Our Health
2020	Our solutions are in nature
2021	We're part of the solution #ForNature
2022	Building a shared future for all life
2023	From agreement to action: Build back biodiversity
2024	Be Part of the Plan
2025	Harmony with nature and sustainable development
2026	Acting locally for global impact

== See also ==
- United Nations Decade on Biodiversity (2011–2020)
- International Year of Biodiversity (2010)
