= United Nations Decade on Biodiversity =

The United Nations General Assembly had declared 2011–20 the United Nations Decade on Biodiversity (Resolution 65/161). The UN Decade on Biodiversity had served to support and promote implementation of the Strategic Plan for Biodiversity and the Aichi Biodiversity Targets, with the goal of significantly reducing biodiversity loss. None of the 20 Aichi targets were achieved, though progress was made towards several of them.

== Background ==
On December 22, 2010, building on the International Year of Biodiversity (2010) and the goal of significantly reducing biodiversity loss, the United Nations General Assembly declared 2011–2020 the United Nations Decade on Biodiversity (Resolution 65/161).

== Aims ==
The UN Decade on Biodiversity served to support and promote the implementation of the objectives of the Strategic Plan for Biodiversity and the Aichi Biodiversity Targets, which were adopted in 2010, at the 10th Conference of the Parties to the CBD, held in Aichi, Japan. Throughout the UN Decade on Biodiversity, governments were encouraged to develop, implement and communicate the results of national strategies for implementation of the Strategic Plan for Biodiversity.

It also sought to promote the involvement of a variety of national and intergovernmental actors and other stakeholders in the goal of mainstreaming biodiversity into broader development planning and economic activities. The aim was to place special focus on supporting actions that address the underlying causes of biodiversity loss, including production and consumption patterns.

The Decade was to be succeeded by the Post-2020 Biodiversity Framework, which is itself a stepping stone to the 2050 Vision of "Living in harmony with nature", which envisages that "By 2050, biodiversity is valued, conserved, restored and wisely used, maintaining ecosystem services, sustaining a healthy planet and delivering benefits essential for all people."

== Outcomes ==
On 30 September 2020, world leaders virtually gathered at the first ever global Summit on Biodiversity. The summit involved pre-recorded statements from over 100 states and organizations. It was intended to build momentum for the fifteenth Conference of the Parties to the United Nations Convention on Biodiversity, which was postponed to 2021 due to the coronavirus. Many speakers acknowledged that none of the Aichi Biodiversity Targets established in 2010 were met during the United Nations Decade on Biodiversity. Of the 60 sub goals used to monitor progress towards the archi goals, 7 were achieved, with progress made on another 38. The decade was followed by the UN Decade on Ecosystem Restoration, which aims to drastically scale up the restoration of degraded and destroyed ecosystems.

== See also ==
- Convention on Biological Diversity
- International Day for Biological Diversity
- International Year of Biodiversity (2010)
- International Year of Forests (2011)
