= Bioprospecting =

Exploration of nature for material with commercial potential

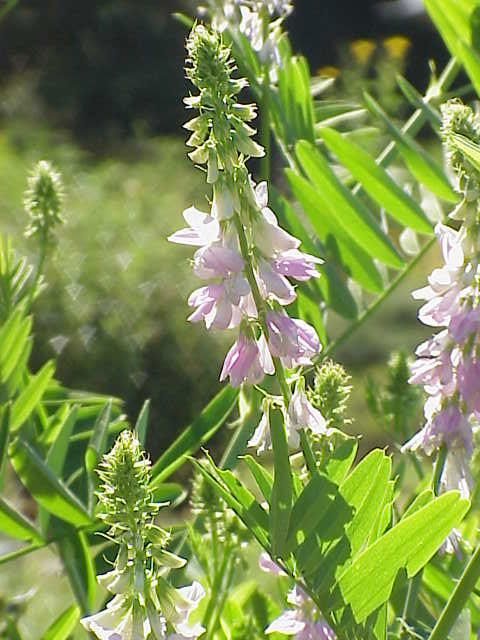
Many important medications have been discovered by bioprospecting including the diabetes drug metformin (developed from a natural product found in Galega officinalis).

Bioprospecting (also known as biodiversity prospecting) is the exploration of natural sources for small molecules, macromolecules and biochemical and genetic information that could be developed into commercially valuable products for the agricultural, aquaculture, bioremediation, cosmetics, nanotechnology, or pharmaceutical industries. In the pharmaceutical industry, for example, almost one third of all small-molecule drugs approved by the U.S. Food and Drug Administration (FDA) between 1981 and 2014 were either natural products or compounds derived from natural products.

Terrestrial plants, fungi and actinobacteria have been the focus of many past bioprospecting programs, but interest is growing in less explored ecosystems (e.g. seas and oceans, caves and polar regions) and organisms (e.g. extremophiles, tropical corals and necrophages) as a means of identifying new molecules with novel biological activities. Species may be randomly screened for bioactivity or rationally selected and screened based on ecological, ethnobiological, ethnomedical, historical or genomic information.

When a region's biological resources or indigenous knowledge are unethically appropriated or commercially exploited without providing fair compensation, this is known as biopiracy. Various international treaties have been negotiated to provide countries legal recourse in the event of biopiracy and to offer commercial actors legal certainty for investment. These include the UN Convention on Biological Diversity and the Nagoya Protocol. The WIPO is currently negotiating more treaties to bridge gaps in this field.

Other risks associated with bioprospecting are the overharvesting of individual species and environmental damage, but legislation has been developed to combat these also. Examples include national laws such as the US Marine Mammal Protection Act and US Endangered Species Act, and international treaties such as the UN Convention on Biological Diversity, the UN Convention on the Law of the Sea, the Biodiversity Beyond National Jurisdictions Treaty, and the Antarctic Treaty.

== Bioprospecting-derived resources and products ==
=== Agriculture ===
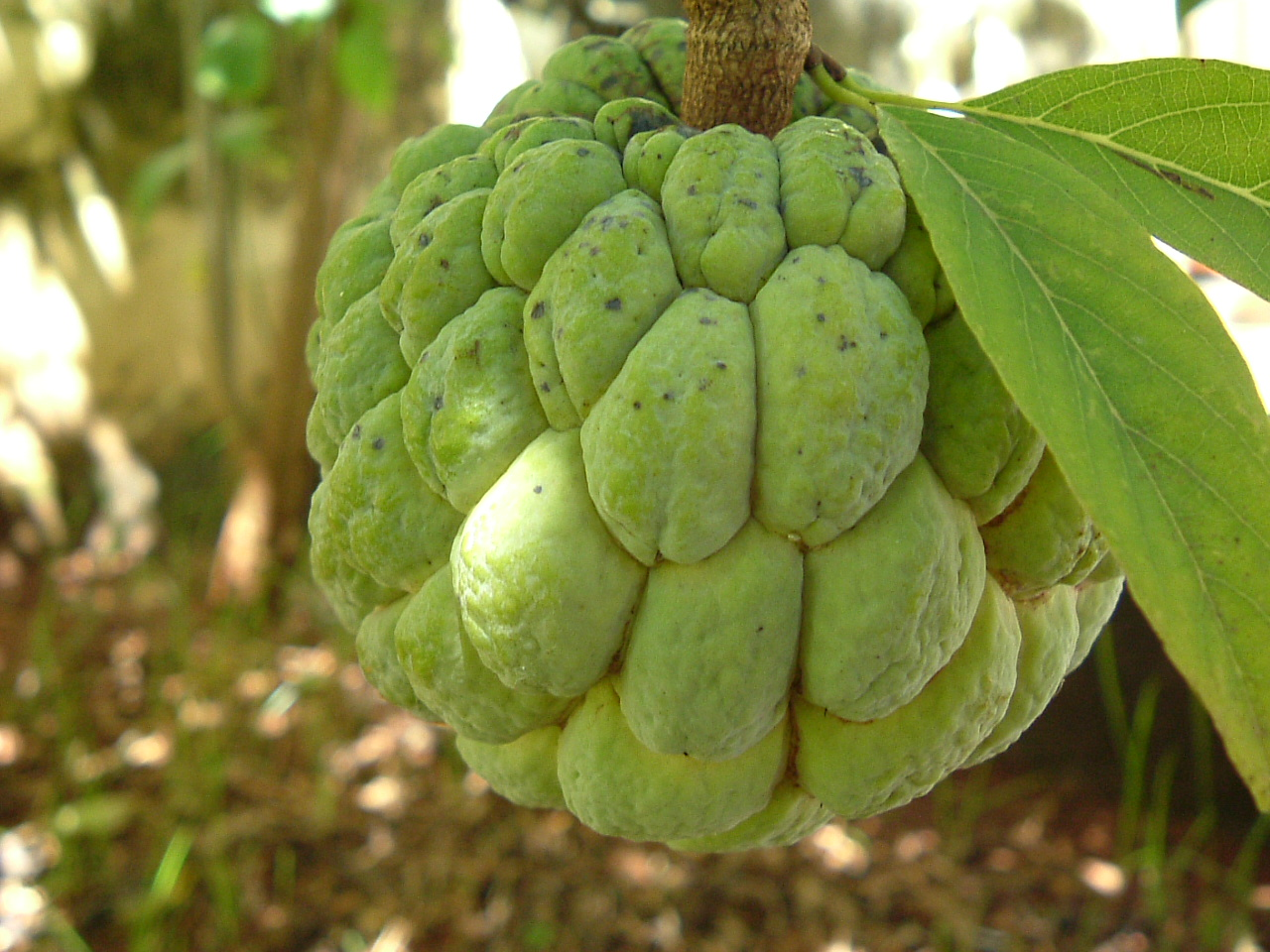
Annonin-based biopesticides, used to protect crops from beetles and other pests, were developed from the plant Annona squamosa.

Bioprospecting-derived resources and products used in agriculture include biofertilizers, biopesticides and veterinary antibiotics. Rhizobium is a genus of soil bacteria used as biofertilizers, Bacillus thuringiensis (also called Bt) is a biopesticide, and valnemulin and tiamulin (discovered and developed from the basidiomycete fungi Omphalina mutila and Clitopilus passeckerianus) are examples of veterinary antibiotics.

=== Bioremediation ===
Examples of bioprospecting products used in bioremediation include Coriolopsis gallica- and Phanerochaete chrysosporium-derived laccase enzymes, used for treating beer factory wastewater and for dechlorinating and decolorizing paper mill effluent.

=== Cosmetics and personal care ===
Cosmetics and personal care products obtained from bioprospecting include Porphyridium cruentum-derived oligosaccharide and oligoelement blends used to treat erythema (rosacea, flushing and dark circles), Xanthobacter autotrophicus-derived zeaxanthin used for skin hydration and UV protection, Clostridium histolyticum-derived collagenases used for skin regeneration, and Microsporum-derived keratinases used for hair removal.

=== Nanotechnology and biosensors ===
Because microbial laccases have a broad substrate range, they can be used in biosensor technology to detect a wide range of organic compounds. For example, laccase-containing electrodes are used to detect polyphenolic compounds in wine, and lignins and phenols in wastewater.

=== Pharmaceuticals ===
The tuberculosis drug streptomycin was discovered from the actinomycete Streptomyces griseus.

Many of the antibacterial drugs in current clinical use were discovered through bioprospecting including the aminoglycosides, tetracyclines, amphenicols, polymyxins, cephalosporins and other β-lactam antibiotics, macrolides, pleuromutilins, glycopeptides, rifamycins, lincosamides, streptogramins, and phosphonic acid antibiotics. The aminoglycoside antibiotic streptomycin, for example, was discovered from the soil bacterium Streptomyces griseus, the fusidane antibiotic fusidic acid was discovered from the soil fungus Acremonium fusidioides, and the pleuromutilin antibiotics (eg. lefamulin) were discovered and developed from the basidiomycete fungi Omphalina mutila and Clitopilus passeckerianus.

Other examples of bioprospecting-derived anti-infective drugs include the antifungal drug griseofulvin (discovered from the soil fungus Penicillium griseofulvum), the antifungal and antileishmanial drug amphotericin B (discovered from the soil bacterium Streptomyces nodosus), the antimalarial drug artemisinin (discovered from the plant Artemisia annua), and the antihelminthic drug ivermectin (developed from the soil bacterium Streptomyces avermitilis).

Bioprospecting-derived pharmaceuticals have been developed for the treatment of non-communicable diseases and conditions too. These include the anticancer drug bleomycin (obtained from the soil bacterium Streptomyces verticillus), the immunosuppressant drug ciclosporin used to treat autoimmune diseases such as rheumatoid arthritis and psoriasis (obtained from the soil fungus Tolypocladium inflatum), the anti-inflammatory drug colchicine used to treat and prevent gout flares (obtained from the plant Colchicum autumnale), the analgesic drug ziconotide (developed from the cone snail Conus magus), and the acetylcholinesterase inhibitor galantamine used to treat Alzheimer's disease (obtained from plants in the Galanthus genus).

== Bioprospecting as a discovery strategy ==
Bioprospecting has both strengths and weaknesses as a strategy for discovering new genes, molecules, and organisms suitable for development and commercialization.

=== Strengths ===
Halichondrin B, an example of a structurally complex and medically important natural product

Bioprospecting-derived small molecules (also known as natural products) are more structurally complex than synthetic chemicals, and therefore show greater specificity towards biological targets. This is a big advantage in drug discovery and development, especially pharmacological aspects of drug discovery and development, where off-target effects can cause adverse drug reactions.

Natural products are also more amenable to membrane transport than synthetic compounds. This is advantageous when developing antibacterial drugs, which may need to traverse both an outer membrane and plasma membrane to reach their target.

For some biotechnological innovations to work, it is important to have enzymes that function at unusually high or low temperatures. An example of this is the polymerase chain reaction (PCR), which is dependent on a DNA polymerase that can operate at 60 °C and above. In other situations, for example dephosphorylation, it can be desirable to run the reaction at low temperature. Extremophile bioprospecting is an important source of such enzymes, yielding thermostable enzymes such as Taq polymerase (from Thermus aquaticus), and cold-adapted enzymes such as shrimp alkaline phosphatase (from Pandalus borealis).

With the Convention on Biological Diversity (CBD) now ratified by most countries, bioprospecting has the potential to bring biodiversity-rich and technologically advanced nations together, and benefit them both educationally and economically (eg. information sharing, technology transfer, new product development, royalty payment).

For useful molecules identified through microbial bioprospecting, scale up of production is feasible at reasonable cost because the producing microorganism can be cultured in a bioreactor.

=== Weaknesses ===
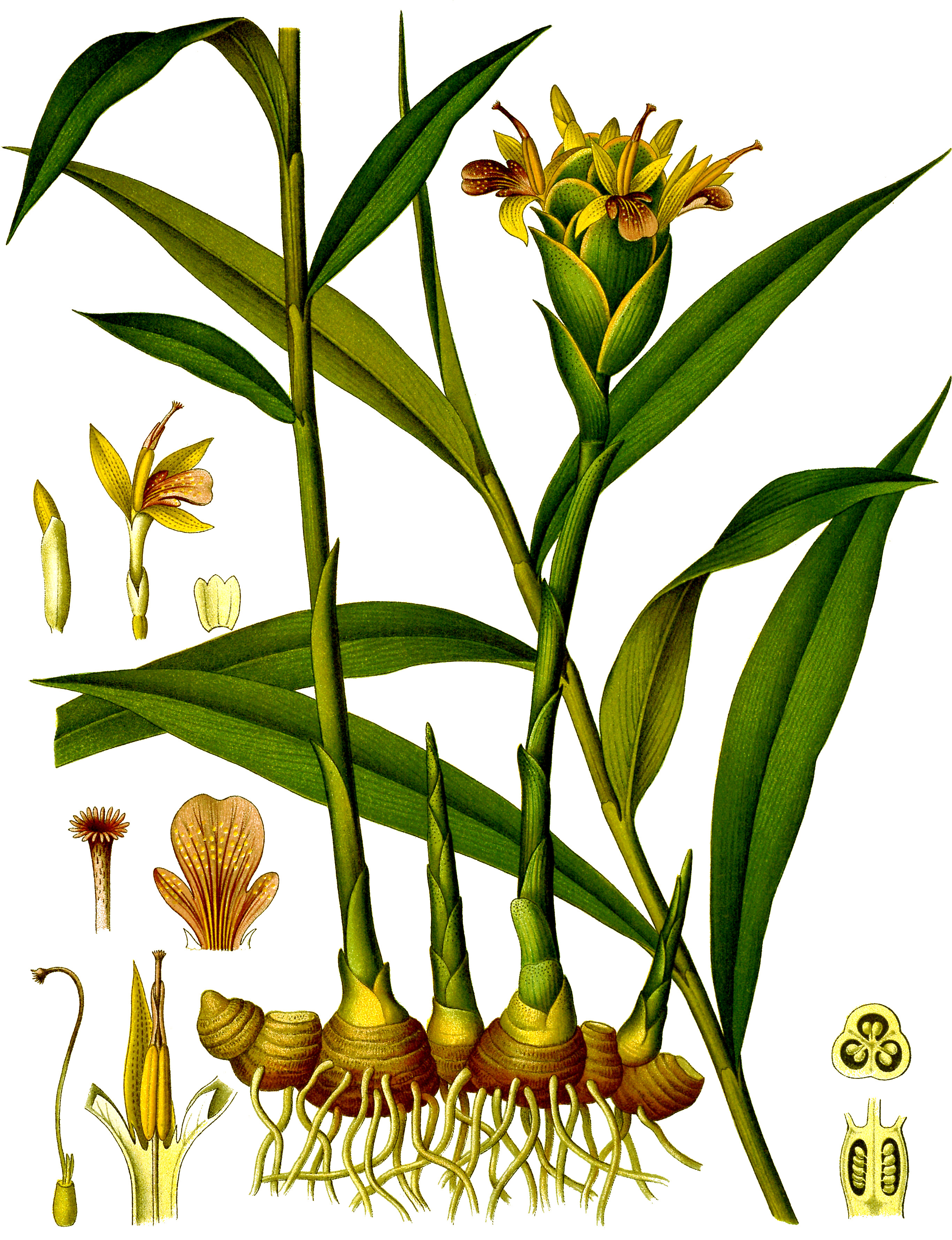
Zingiber officinale, an example of a medicinal plant used in multiple cultures

Although some potentially very useful microorganisms are known to exist in nature (eg. lignocellulose-metabolizing microbes), difficulties have been encountered cultivating these in a laboratory setting. This problem may be resolvable by genetically manipulating easier-to-culture organisms such as Escherichia coli or Streptomyces coelicolor to express the gene cluster responsible for the desired activity.

Isolating and identifying the compound(s) responsible for a biological extract's activity can be difficult. Also, subsequent elucidation of the mechanism of action of the isolated compound can be time-consuming. Technological advancements in liquid chromatography, mass spectrometry and other techniques are helping to overcome these challenges.

Implementing and enforcing bioprospecting-related treaties and legislation is not always easy. Drug development is an inherently expensive and time-consuming process with low success rates, and this makes it difficult to quantify the value of potential products when drafting bioprospecting agreements. Intellectual property rights may be difficult to award too. For example, legal rights to a medicinal plant may be disputable if it has been discovered by different people in different parts of the world at different times.

Whilst the structural complexity of natural products is generally advantageous in drug discovery, it can make the subsequent manufacture of drug candidates difficult. This problem is sometimes resolvable by identifying the part of the natural product structure responsible for activity and developing a simplified synthetic analogue. This was necessary with the natural product halichondrin B, its simplified analogue eribulin now approved and marketed as an anticancer drug.

== Bioprospecting pitfalls ==
Errors and oversights can occur at different steps in the bioprospecting process including collection of source material, screening source material for bioactivity, testing isolated compounds for toxicity, and identification of mechanism of action.

=== Collection of source material ===
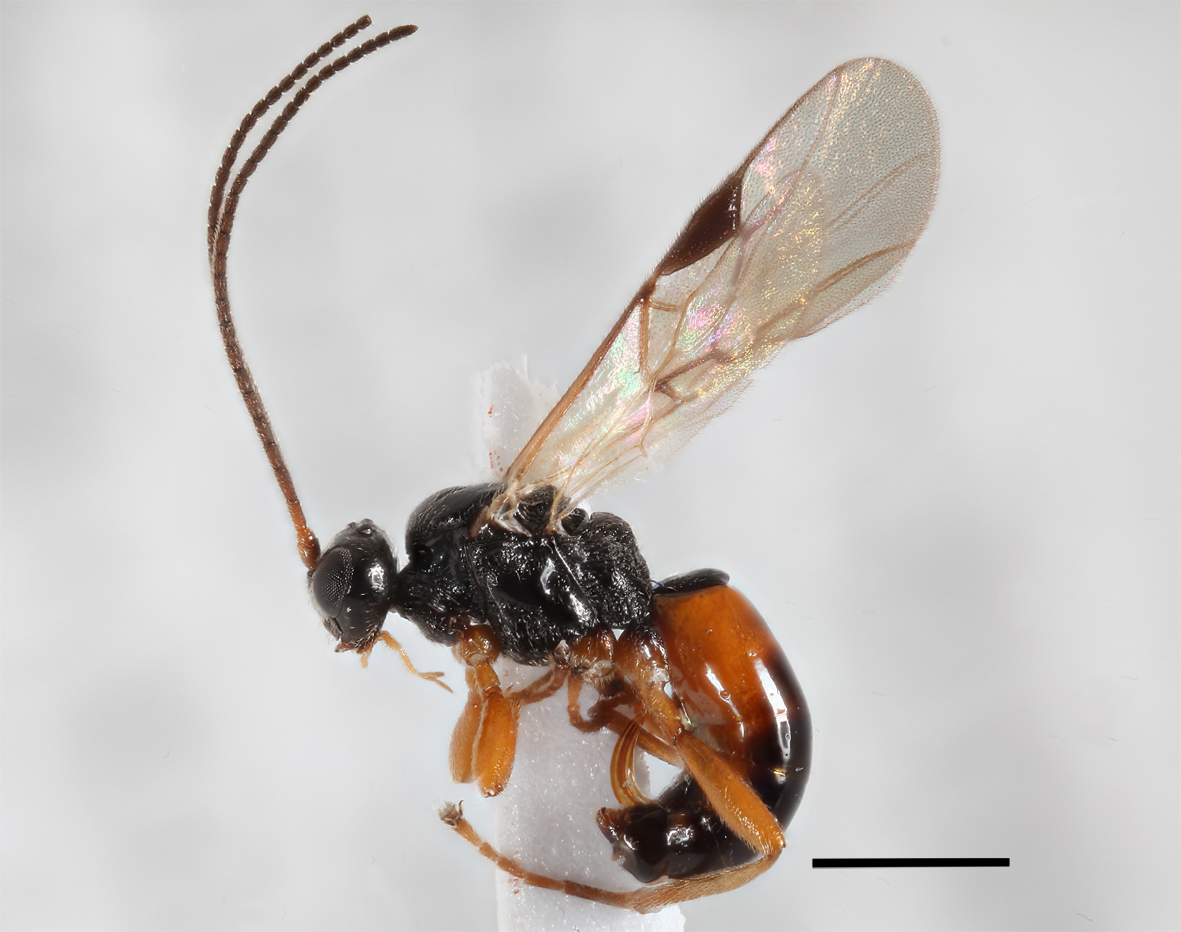
Voucher deposition allows species identity to be re-evaluated if there are problems re-isolating an active constituent from a biological source.

Prior to collecting biological material or traditional knowledge, the correct permissions must be obtained from the source country, land owner etc. Failure to do so can result in criminal proceedings and rejection of any subsequent patent applications. It is also important to collect biological material in adequate quantities, to have biological material formally identified, and to deposit a voucher specimen with a repository for long-term preservation and storage. This helps ensure any important discoveries are reproducible. Environmental impacts must also be considered as the over-harvesting of desirable species can put them at risk of extinction.

=== Bioactivity and toxicity testing ===
When testing extracts and isolated compounds for bioactivity and toxicity, the use of standard protocols (eg. CLSI, ISO, NIH, EURL ECVAM, OECD) is desirable because this improves test result accuracy and reproducibility. Also, if the source material is likely to contain known (previously discovered) active compounds (eg. streptomycin in the case of actinomycetes), then dereplication is necessary to exclude these extracts and compounds from the discovery pipeline as early as possible. In addition, it is important to consider solvent effects on the cells or cell lines being tested, to include reference compounds (ie. pure chemical compounds for which accurate bioactivity and toxicity data are available), to set limits on cell line passage number (eg. 10–20 passages), to include all the necessary positive and negative controls, and to be aware of assay limitations. These steps help ensure assay results are accurate, reproducible and interpreted correctly.

=== Identification of mechanism of action ===
When attempting to elucidate the mechanism of action of an extract or isolated compound, it is important to use multiple orthogonal assays. Using just a single assay, especially a single in vitro assay, gives a very incomplete picture of an extract or compound's effect on the human body. In the case of Valeriana officinalis root extract, for example, the sleep-inducing effects of this extract are due to multiple compounds and mechanisms including interaction with GABA receptors and relaxation of smooth muscle. The mechanism of action of an isolated compound can also be misidentified if a single assay is used because some compounds interfere with assays. For example, the sulfhydryl-scavenging assay used to detect histone acetyltransferase inhibition can give a false positive result if the test compound reacts covalently with cysteines.

== Criticism of bioprospecting ==
Some forms of bioprospecting have been criticised. One example is the bioprospecting of medicinal plants from other countries and cultures. The bioprospecting of crops from other cultures has also been criticised.

=== Criticism of ethnobotanical bioprospecting ===
Bioprospecting has been promoted by the United Nations, environmental nongovernmental organizations (NGOs), World Trade Organization and World Intellectual Property Organization as an ethical and sustainable form of economic development that is based on the protection of biodiversity. Ana Isla, an academic and ecofeminist, argues against this. According to Isla, the creation of "conservation areas" for ecotourism, biodiversity research and bioprospecting denies local communities access to common lands where they previously hunted and fished. In these cases, conservation and commerce may harm indigenous communities who rely on these food sources for survival. The imposition of sustainable development has also been seen as invalidating the sustainability of traditional practices.

Early proponents of bioprospecting were European botanical gardens, particularly the Kew Gardens, as part of their botanical research. This process would generally involve searching for desirable plants, often in Latin America, to be improved for cultivation in monoculture plantations in Asia. In order to identify desirable plants, bioprospectors have historically relied on the knowledge of indigenous populations, which has led to appropriation of economic, cultural, and spiritual resources of these communities without permission, compensation, or credit—often referred to as biopiracy. This has caused critics to label bioprospecting and biopiracy modern forms of extractivism, which is an economic system of accumulation that restructures economies, political and legal systems, and relationships based on the exploitation of natural resources and local populations. Through this lens, it is indigenous knowledge and the genetic and chemical compounds of plants that have been extracted as natural resources.

Criticism of bioprospecting, especially related to biopiracy and the appropriation of traditional knowledge by foreigners, led to the creation and implementation of the Nagoya Protocol as a supplementary agreement to the United Nations Convention on Biological Diversity. This protocol provides a legal framework for fair and equitable access and benefit sharing for the use of genetic resources and traditional knowledge, including specific considerations in regard to relationships with local and indigenous communities.

Although the Nagoya Protocol addressed many concerns related to bioprospecting, there has still been criticism of how bioprospecting mindsets have shaped global relationships with non-human beings through a Western worldview. When botanical researchers and pharmaceutical, medical, and agricultural companies identify desirable plants, they transform them into commodities in order to have value within global capitalist systems. This process of commodification requires reducing plants to specific compounds, and stripping away their relational identity, which includes the location and local communities from which they come. This contrasts with the worldviews of many cultures and indigenous communities that view plants and other non-human beings as kin. Through this lens plants are spiritual beings with agency, and there is an emphasis on reciprocal relationships. Some authors argue that bioprospecting delegitimizes the relationships that local communities already have with the plants, and exerts Western science as a superior form of knowledge and ownership.

==== Cinchona ====
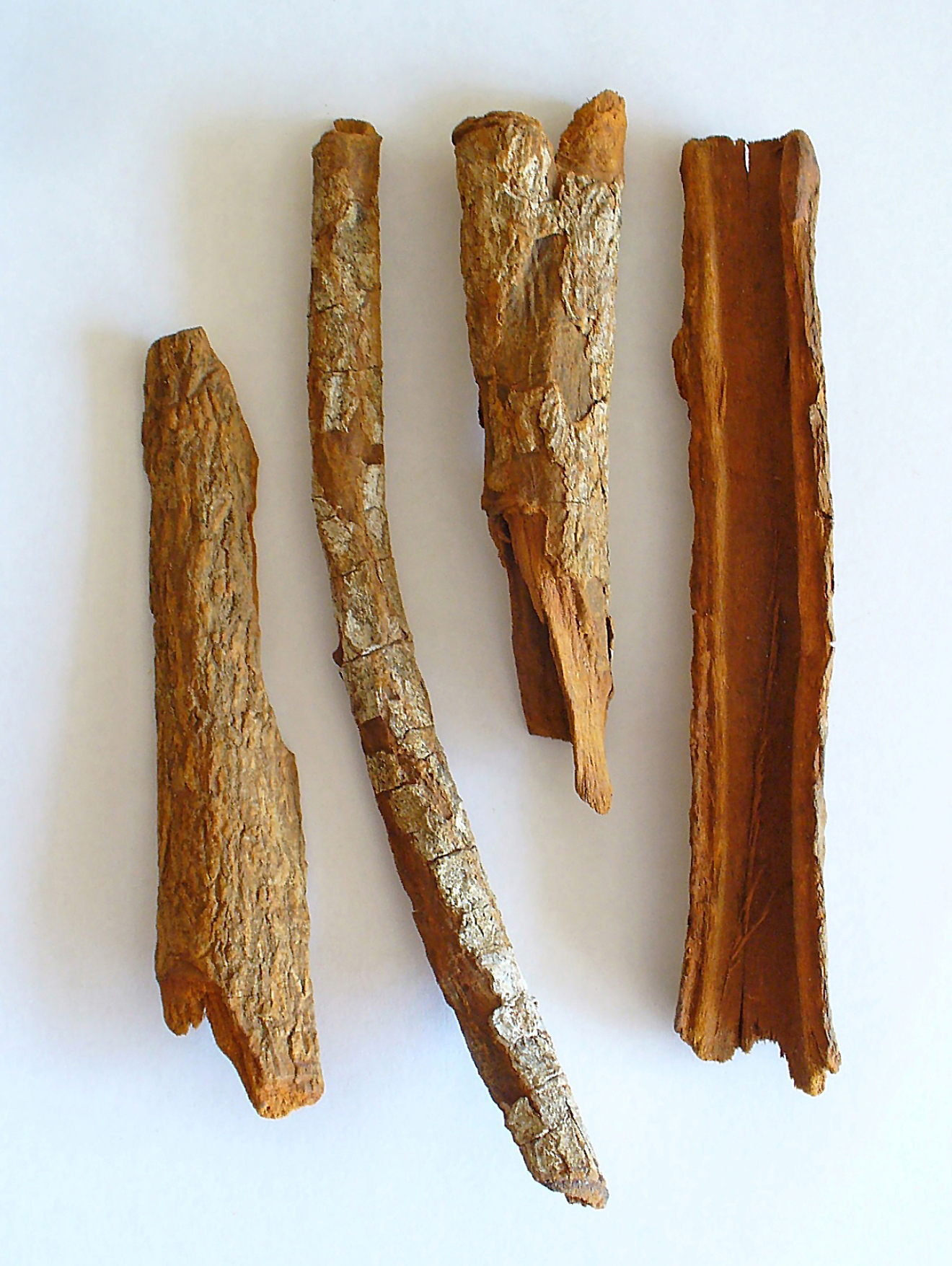
Cinchona bark

Several authors have used the case of Cinchona plants in Latin America as an example of bioprospecting being historically intertwined with colonization and exploitation. Cinchona is a genus of flowering trees and shrubs in the family Rubiaceae. Some species of these trees possess the compound quinine in their bark, which was the first identified treatment for malaria. In the Andes region where these trees are native, indigenous communities were the first to use these plants medicinally. Cinchona bark became highly valuable in the 18th century after being brought back to Europe by Jesuit priests during the Spanish conquest of Latin America. Exploitation of this bark began in the Loja region of southern Ecuador, but expanded to Peru, Columbia, and Bolivia as demand increased. From 1817-1831 German scientists conducted experiments on Cinchona plants, local populations, and enslaved people in Brazil during expeditions focused on manipulating medicinal plants and knowledge to create German medicines. European scientists were sent to collect seeds to create plantations, shifting from extraction to oversees cultivation. In the early 20th century, Dutch production of Cinchona created a monopoly on the market and Cinchona bioprospecting in Latin America stagnated. During World War II, the US was cut off by this supply due to Japanese invasion of the Dutch East Indies, and the war increased the need for this medicine to support military occupation in tropical regions with malaria. This led to the industry of Cinchona extraction being revived in Latin America to create a new supply for the US. Part of this strategy included offering loans to Latin American countries, creating further economic dependence on the US and opening the way for US-lead institutions to control finances and trade in Latin America for US gain. The process of harvesting bark was often environmentally destructive, destroying large areas of trees and putting some populations of native cinchona at risk of extinction. Bark harvesting paid low wages that kept many indigenous laborers from being able to pay off debts, so they had to harvest and prepare cinchona bark for export in poor working conditions.

== Biopiracy ==
The term biopiracy was coined by Pat Mooney, to describe a practice in which indigenous knowledge of nature, originating with indigenous peoples, is used by others for profit, without authorization or compensation to the indigenous people themselves. For example, when bioprospectors draw on indigenous knowledge of medicinal plants which is later patented by medical companies without recognizing the fact that the knowledge is not new or invented by the patenter, this deprives the indigenous community of their potential rights to the commercial product derived from the technology that they themselves had developed. There can be financial and cultural barriers that prevent Indigenous communities from patenting medicinal plants and healing practices, so corporations often have greater access to intellectual property rights. In some cases, these patents have restricted local communities from replanting or selling medicinal plants that they have used for generations. Women can be disproportionately impacted by biopiracy in communities where they act as family healers. Critics of this practice, such as Greenpeace, claim these practices contribute to inequality between developing countries rich in biodiversity, and developed countries hosting biotech firms.

In the 1990s many large pharmaceutical and drug discovery companies responded to charges of biopiracy by ceasing work on natural products, turning to combinatorial chemistry to develop novel compounds.

== Famous cases of biopiracy ==
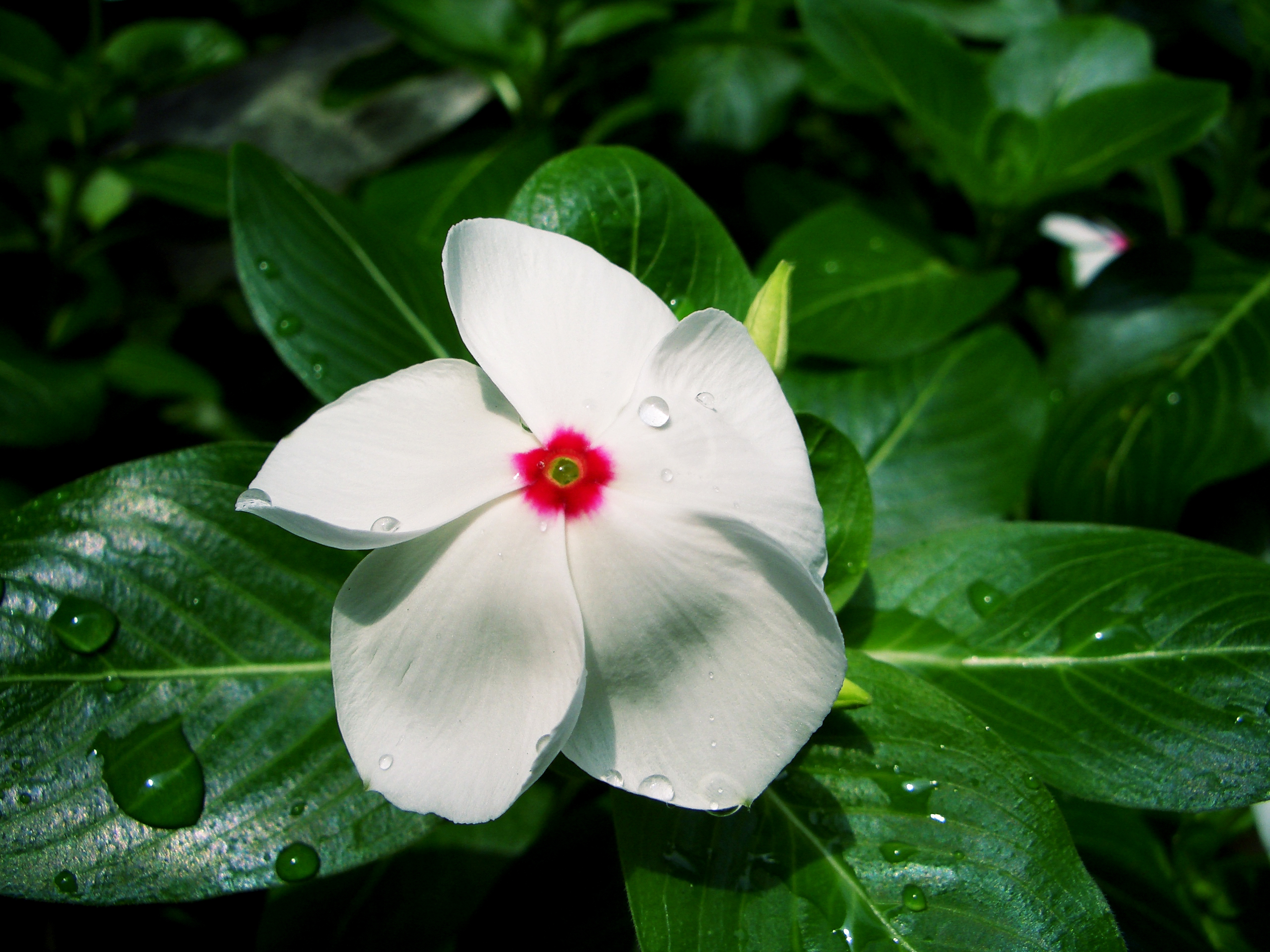
A white rosy periwinkle

=== The rosy periwinkle ===
The rosy periwinkle case dates from the 1950s. The rosy periwinkle, while native to Madagascar, had been widely introduced into other tropical countries around the world well before the discovery of vincristine. Different countries are reported as having acquired different beliefs about the medical properties of the plant. This meant that researchers could obtain local knowledge from one country and plant samples from another. The use of the plant for diabetes was the original stimulus for research. Effectiveness in the treatment of both Hodgkin lymphoma and leukemia were discovered instead. The Hodgkin lymphoma chemotherapeutic drug vinblastine is derivable from the rosy periwinkle.

=== The Maya ICBG controversy ===
The Maya ICBG bioprospecting controversy took place in 1999–2000, when the International Cooperative Biodiversity Group led by ethnobiologist Brent Berlin was accused of being engaged in unethical forms of bioprospecting by several NGOs and indigenous organizations. The ICBG aimed to document the biodiversity of Chiapas, Mexico, and the ethnobotanical knowledge of the indigenous Maya people – in order to ascertain whether there were possibilities of developing medical products based on any of the plants used by the indigenous groups.

The Maya ICBG case was among the first to draw attention to the problems of distinguishing between benign forms of bioprospecting and unethical biopiracy, and to the difficulties of securing community participation and prior informed consent for would-be bioprospectors.

=== The neem tree ===
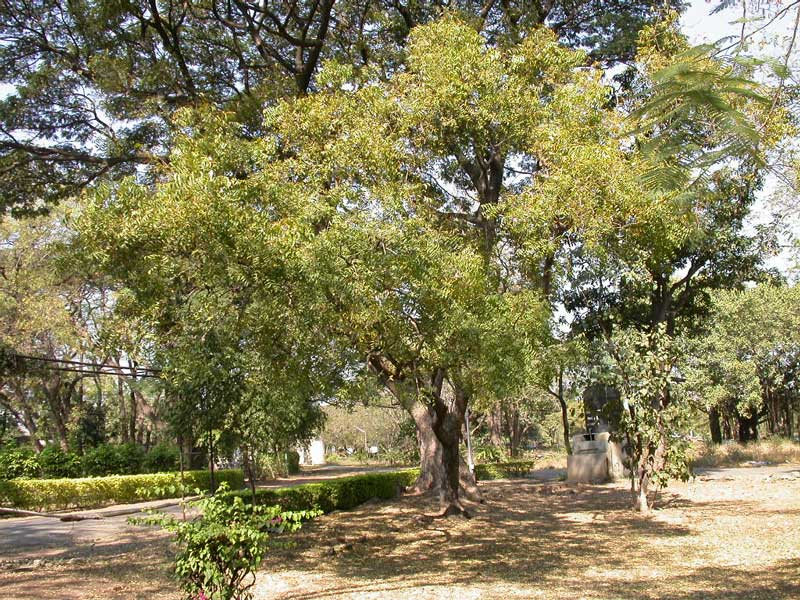
A neem tree

In 1994, the U.S. Department of Agriculture and W. R. Grace and Company received a European patent on methods of controlling fungal infections in plants using a composition that included extracts from the neem tree (Azadirachta indica), which grows throughout India and Nepal. In 2000 the patent was successfully opposed by several groups from the EU and India including the EU Green Party, Vandana Shiva, and the International Federation of Organic Agriculture Movements (IFOAM) on the basis that the fungicidal activity of neem extract had long been known in Indian traditional medicine. WR Grace appealed and lost in 2005.

=== Basmati rice ===
In 1997, the US corporation RiceTec (a subsidiary of RiceTec AG of Liechtenstein) attempted to patent certain hybrids of basmati rice and semidwarf long-grain rice. The Indian government challenged this patent and, in 2002, fifteen of the patent's twenty claims were invalidated.

=== The Enola bean ===
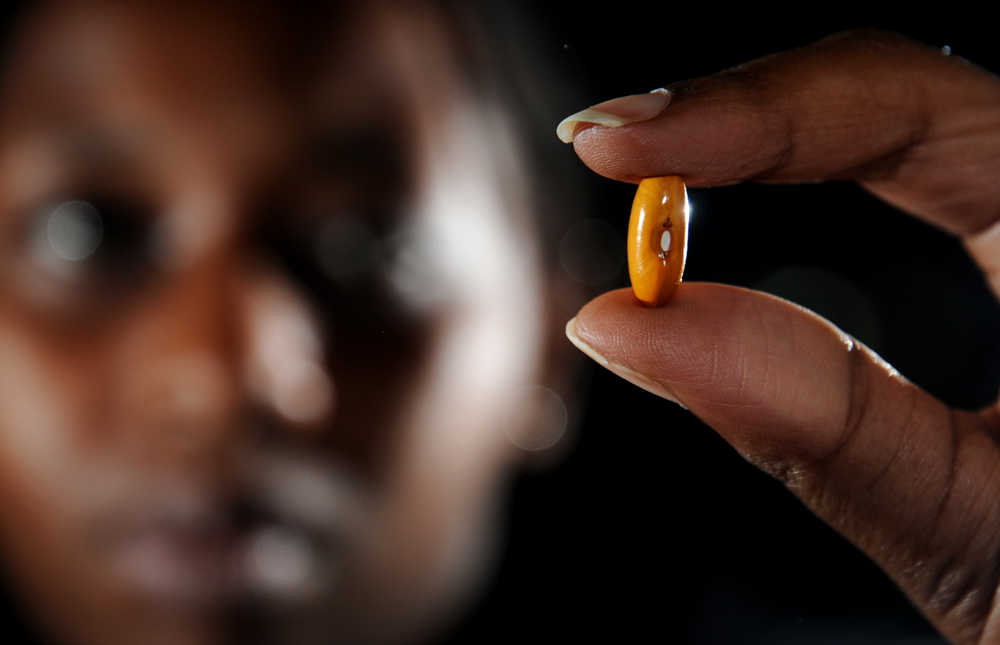
The Enola bean

The Enola bean is a variety of Mexican yellow bean, so called after the wife of the man who patented it in 1999. The allegedly distinguishing feature of the variety is seeds of a specific shade of yellow. The patent-holder subsequently sued a large number of importers of Mexican yellow beans with the following result: "...export sales immediately dropped over 90% among importers that had been selling these beans for years, causing economic damage to more than 22,000 farmers in northern Mexico who depended on sales of this bean." A lawsuit was filed on behalf of the farmers and, in 2005, the US-PTO ruled in favor of the farmers. In 2008, the patent was revoked.

=== Hoodia gordonii ===
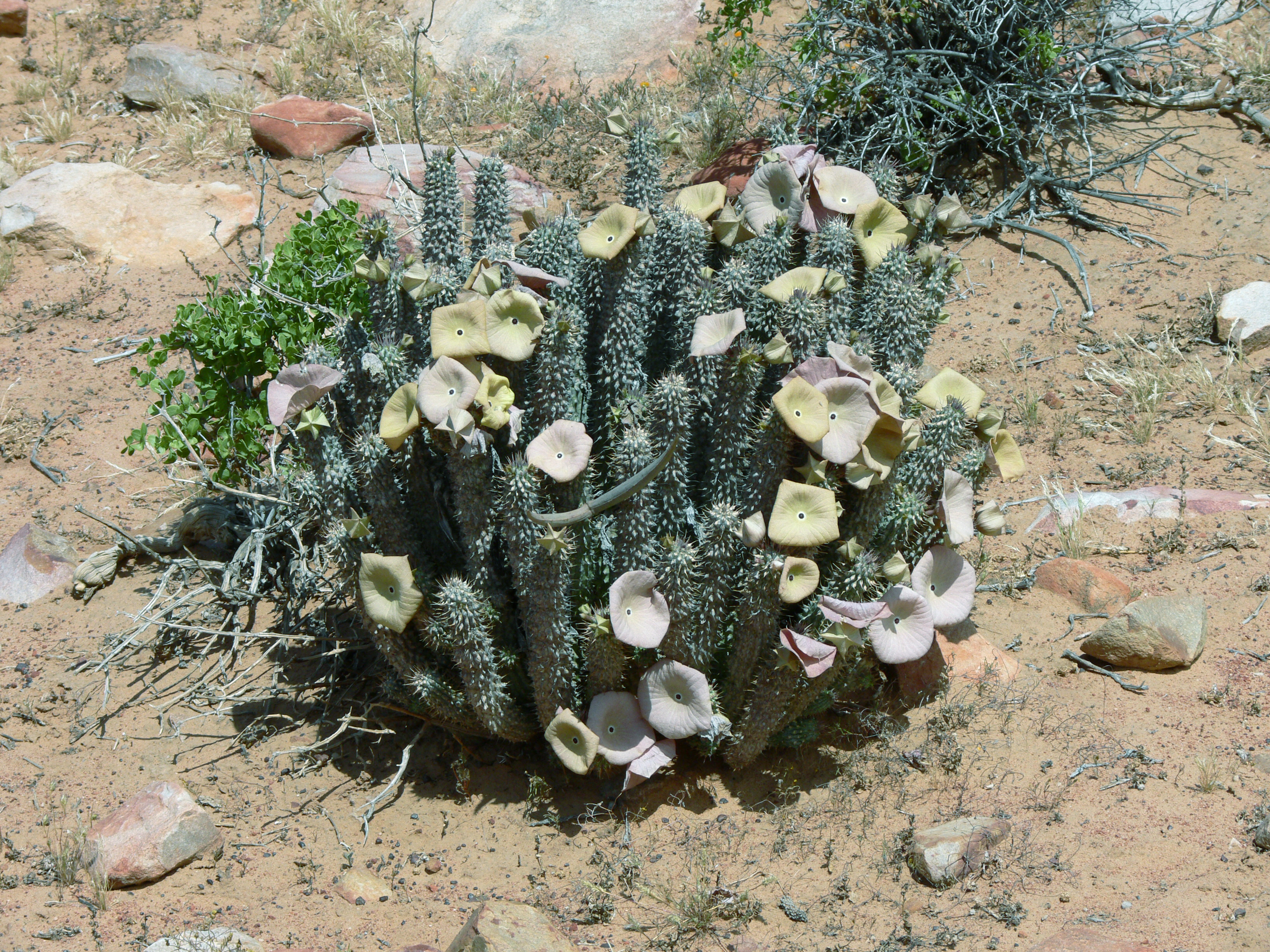
The succulent Hoodia gordonii

Hoodia gordonii, a succulent plant, originates from the Kalahari Desert of South Africa. For generations it has been known to the traditionally living San people as an appetite suppressant. In 1996 South Africa's Council for Scientific and Industrial Research began working with companies, including Unilever, to develop dietary supplements based on Hoodia. Originally the San people were not scheduled to receive any benefits from the commercialization of their traditional knowledge, but in 2003 the South African San Council made an agreement with CSIR in which they would receive from 6 to 8% of the revenue from the sale of Hoodia products.

In 2008 after having invested €20 million in R&D on Hoodia as a potential ingredient in dietary supplements for weight loss, Unilever terminated the project because their clinical studies did not show that Hoodia was safe and effective enough to bring to market.

=== Further cases ===
The following is a selection of further recent cases of biopiracy. Most of them do not relate to traditional medicines.

- Thirty-six cases of biopiracy in Africa.
- The case of the Maya people's pozol drink.
- The case of the Maya and other people's use of Mimosa tenuiflora and many other cases.
- The case of the Andean maca radish.
- The cases of turmeric (India), karela (India), quinoa (Bolivia), oubli berries (Gabon), and others.
- The case of captopril (developed from a Brazilian tribe's arrowhead poison).

== Legal and political aspects ==
=== Patent law ===
One common misunderstanding is that pharmaceutical companies patent the plants they collect. While obtaining a patent on a naturally occurring organism as previously known or used is not possible, patents may be taken out on specific chemicals isolated or developed from plants. Often these patents are obtained with a stated and researched use of those chemicals. Generally the existence, structure and synthesis of those compounds is not a part of the indigenous medical knowledge that led researchers to analyze the plant in the first place. As a result, even if the indigenous medical knowledge is taken as prior art, that knowledge does not by itself make the active chemical compound "obvious," which is the standard applied under patent law.

In the United States, patent law can be used to protect "isolated and purified" compounds – even, in one instance, a new chemical element (see USP 3,156,523). In 1873, Louis Pasteur patented a "yeast" which was "free from disease" (patent #141072). Patents covering biological inventions have been treated similarly. In the 1980 case of Diamond v. Chakrabarty, the Supreme Court upheld a patent on a bacterium that had been genetically modified to consume petroleum, reasoning that U.S. law permits patents on "anything under the sun that is made by man." The United States Patent and Trademark Office (USPTO) has observed that "a patent on a gene covers the isolated and purified gene but does not cover the gene as it occurs in nature".

Also possible under US law is patenting a cultivar, a new variety of an existing organism. The patent on the Enola bean (now revoked) was an example of this sort of patent. The intellectual property laws of the US also recognize plant breeders' rights under the Plant Variety Protection Act, 7 U.S.C. §§ 2321–2582.

=== Convention on Biological Diversity ===
Parties to the CBD Signed, but not ratified Non-signatory

The Convention on Biological Diversity (CBD) came into force in 1993. It secured rights to control access to genetic resources for the countries in which those resources are located. One objective of the CBD is to enable lesser-developed countries to better benefit from their resources and traditional knowledge. Under the rules of the CBD, bioprospectors are required to obtain informed consent to access such resources, and must share any benefits with the biodiversity-rich country. However, some critics believe that the CBD has failed to establish appropriate regulations to prevent biopiracy. Others claim that the main problem is the failure of national governments to pass appropriate laws implementing the provisions of the CBD. The Nagoya Protocol to the CBD, which came into force in 2014, provides further regulations. The CBD has been ratified, acceded or accepted by 196 countries and jurisdictions globally, with exceptions including the Holy See and United States.

=== Bioprospecting contracts ===
The requirements for bioprospecting as set by CBD has created a new branch of international patent and trade law, bioprospecting contracts. Bioprospecting contracts lay down the rules of benefit sharing between researchers and countries, and can bring royalties to lesser-developed countries. However, although these contracts are based on prior informed consent and compensation (unlike biopiracy), every owner or carrier of an indigenous knowledge and resources are not always consulted or compensated, as it would be difficult to ensure every individual is included. Because of this, some have proposed that the indigenous or other communities form a type of representative micro-government that would negotiate with researchers to form contracts in such a way that the community benefits from the arrangements. Unethical bioprospecting contracts (as distinct from ethical ones) can be viewed as a new form of biopiracy.

An example of a bioprospecting contract is the agreement between Merck and INBio of Costa Rica.

=== Traditional knowledge database ===
Due to previous cases of biopiracy and to prevent further cases, the Government of India has converted traditional Indian medicinal information from ancient manuscripts and other resources into an electronic resource; this resulted in the Traditional Knowledge Digital Library in 2001. The texts are being recorded from Tamil, Sanskrit, Urdu, Persian and Arabic; made available to patent offices in English, German, French, Japanese and Spanish. The aim is to protect India's heritage from being exploited by foreign companies. Hundreds of yoga poses are also kept in the collection. The library has also signed agreements with leading international patent offices such as European Patent Office (EPO), United Kingdom Trademark & Patent Office (UKTPO) and the United States Patent and Trademark Office to protect traditional knowledge from biopiracy as it allows patent examiners at International Patent Offices to access TKDL databases for patent search and examination purposes.

== See also ==
- Intellectual capital/Intellectual property
- Natural capital
- Biological patent
- Traditional knowledge/Indigenous knowledge
- Pharmacognosy
- Plant breeders' rights
- Bioethics
- Maya ICBG bioprospecting controversy
- International Cooperative Biodiversity Group
- Biological Diversity Act, 2002
- Agreement on Trade-Related Aspects of Intellectual Property Rights (TRIPS) (1994)
- International Treaty on Plant Genetic Resources for Food and Agriculture (2001)

== Bibliography and resources ==
- The Secretariat of the Convention on Biological Diversity (United Nations Environment Programme) maintains an information centre which as of April 2006 lists some 3000 "monographs, reports and serials".
- Secretariat of the Convention on Biological Diversity (United Nations Environment Programme), Bibliography of Journal Articles on the Convention on Biological Diversity (March 2006). Contains references to almost 200 articles. Some of these are available in full text from the CBD information centre.
- Shiva V (1997). Biopiracy: The Plunder of Nature and Knowledge. South End Press.
- Chen J (2005). "Biodiversity and Biotechnology: A Misunderstood Relation". Michigan State Law Review. 2005: 51–102. SSRN 782184.
