= Convention on Biological Diversity =

Multilateral environmental agreement

- Type: Multilateral environmental agreement
- Context: Environmentalism, Biodiversity conservation
- Drafted: 22 May 1992
- Signed: 5 June 1992 – 4 June 1993
- Location: Rio de Janeiro, Brazil; New York, United States
- Effective: 29 December 1993
- Condition: Ratification by 30 States
- Parties: 196 States: Cook Islands; European Union; Niue; State of Palestine; All UN Member States except; United States
- Depositary: Secretary-General of the United Nations
- Languages: Arabic; Chinese; English; French; Russian; Spanish

Full text
- United Nations Convention on Biological Diversity at Wikisource

The Convention on Biological Diversity (CBD), known informally as the Biodiversity Convention, is a multilateral treaty. The Convention has three main goals: the conservation of biological diversity (or biodiversity); the sustainable use of its components; and the fair and equitable sharing of benefits arising from genetic resources. Its objective is to develop national strategies for the conservation and sustainable use of biological diversity, and it is often seen as the key document regarding sustainable development.

The Convention was opened for signature at the Earth Summit in Rio de Janeiro on 5 June 1992 and entered into force on 29 December 1993. The United States is the only UN member state which has not ratified the Convention. It has two supplementary agreements, the Cartagena Protocol and Nagoya Protocol.

The Cartagena Protocol is an international treaty governing the movements of living modified organisms (LMOs) resulting from modern biotechnology from one country to another. It was adopted on 29 January 2000 as a supplementary agreement to the CBD and entered into force on 11 September 2003.

The Nagoya Protocol is another supplementary agreement to the CBD. It provides a transparent legal framework for the effective implementation of one of the three objectives of the CBD: the fair and equitable sharing of benefits arising out of the utilization of genetic resources. The Nagoya Protocol was adopted on 29 October 2010 in Nagoya, Japan, and entered into force on 12 October 2014.

The Secretariat of the CBD was the focal point of the 2010 International Year of Biodiversity. Following a recommendation of CBD signatories at Nagoya, the UN declared 2011 to 2020 as the United Nations Decade on Biodiversity in December 2010. The Convention's Strategic Plan for Biodiversity 2011–2020, created in 2010, include the Aichi Biodiversity Targets. The Aichi Biodiversity Targets were 20 international goals set under the Convention to protect biodiversity, sustainable use of natural resources, and to protect species. However, countries failed to meet the Aichi Targets as they lacked clarity, were hard to measure, actions were unreported, and there was limited funding. Low prioritization was given to this matter when compared to other industries like agriculture, further leading to its ineffectiveness.

The meetings of the Parties to the Convention are known as Conferences of the Parties (COP), with the first one (COP 1) held in Nassau, Bahamas, in 1994 and the most recent one (COP 16) in 2024 in Cali, Colombia.

In the area of marine and coastal biodiversity CBD's focus at present is to identify Ecologically or Biologically Significant Marine Areas (EBSAs) in specific ocean locations based on scientific criteria. The aim is to create an international legally binding instrument (ILBI) involving area-based planning and decision-making under UNCLOS to support the conservation and sustainable use of marine biological diversity beyond areas of national jurisdiction (BBNJ treaty or High Seas Treaty).

== Origin and scope ==
The notion of an international convention on biodiversity was conceived at a United Nations Environment Programme (UNEP) Ad Hoc Working Group of Experts on Biological Diversity in November 1988. The subsequent year, the Ad Hoc Working Group of Technical and Legal Experts was established for the drafting of a legal text which addressed the conservation and sustainable use of biological diversity, as well as the sharing of benefits arising from their utilization with sovereign states and local communities. In 1991, an intergovernmental negotiating committee was established, tasked with finalizing the Convention's text.

A Conference for the Adoption of the Agreed Text of the Convention on Biological Diversity was held in Nairobi, Kenya, in 1992, and its conclusions were distilled in the Nairobi Final Act. The Convention's text was opened for signature on 5 June 1992 at the United Nations Conference on Environment and Development (the Rio "Earth Summit"). By its closing date, 4 June 1993, the Convention had received 168 signatures. It entered into force on 29 December 1993.

The Convention recognized for the first time in international law that the conservation of biodiversity is "a common concern of humankind" and is an integral part of the development process. The agreement covers all ecosystems, species, and genetic resources. It links traditional conservation efforts to the economic goal of using biological resources sustainably. It sets principles for the fair and equitable sharing of the benefits arising from the use of genetic resources, notably those destined for commercial use. It also covers the rapidly expanding field of biotechnology through its Cartagena Protocol on Biosafety, addressing technology development and transfer, benefit-sharing and biosafety issues. Importantly, the Convention is legally binding; countries that join it ('Parties') are obliged to implement its provisions.

The Convention reminds decision-makers of the finite status of natural resources and sets out a philosophy of sustainable use. While past conservation efforts were aimed at protecting particular species and habitats, the Convention recognizes that ecosystems, species and genes must be used for the benefit of humans. However, this should be done in a way and at a rate that does not lead to the long-term decline of biological diversity.

The Convention also offers decision-makers guidance based on the precautionary principle which demands that where there is a threat of significant reduction or loss of biological diversity, lack of full scientific certainty should not be used as a reason for postponing measures to avoid or minimize such a threat. The Convention acknowledges that substantial investments are required to conserve biological diversity. It argues, however, that conservation will bring us significant environmental, economic and social benefits in return.

The Convention on Biological Diversity of 2010 banned some forms of geoengineering.

== Executive secretary ==
As of April 2024, the acting executive secretary is Astrid Schomaker.

The previous executive secretaries were: David Cooper (2023–2024), Elizabeth Maruma Mrema (2020–2023), pl:Cristiana Pașca Palmer (2017–2019), Braulio Ferreira de Souza Dias (2012–2017), Ahmed Djoghlaf (2006–2012), Hamdallah Zedan (1998–2005), Calestous Juma (1995–1998), and Angela Cropper (1993–1995).

== Issues ==
Some of the many issues dealt with under the Convention include:

- Measures the incentives for the conservation and sustainable use of biological diversity.
- Regulated access to genetic resources and traditional knowledge, including Prior Informed Consent of the party providing resources.
- Sharing, in a fair and equitable way, the results of research and development and the benefits arising from the commercial and other utilization of genetic resources with the Contracting Party providing such resources (governments and/or local communities that provided the traditional knowledge or biodiversity resources utilized).
- Access to and transfer of technology, including biotechnology, to the governments and/or local communities that provided traditional knowledge and/or biodiversity resources.
- Technical and scientific cooperation.
- Coordination of a global directory of taxonomic expertise (Global Taxonomy Initiative).
- Impact assessment.
- Education and public awareness.
- Provision of financial resources.
- National reporting on efforts to implement treaty commitments.

== International bodies established ==
=== Conference of the Parties (COP) ===
The Convention's governing body is the Conference of the Parties (COP), consisting of all governments (and regional economic integration organizations) that have ratified the treaty. This ultimate authority reviews progress under the Convention, identifies new priorities, and sets work plans for members. The COP can also make amendments to the Convention, create expert advisory bodies, review progress reports by member nations, and collaborate with other international organizations and agreements.

The Conference of the Parties uses expertise and support from several other bodies that are established by the Convention. In addition to committees or mechanisms established on an ad hoc basis, the main organs are:

=== CBD Secretariat ===
The CBD Secretariat, based in Montreal, Quebec, Canada, operates under UNEP, the United Nations Environment Programme. Its main functions are to organize meetings, draft documents, assist member governments in the implementation of the programme of work, coordinate with other international organizations, and collect and disseminate information.

=== Subsidiary Body for Scientific, Technical and Technological Advice (SBSTTA) ===
The SBSTTA is a committee composed of experts from member governments competent in relevant fields. It plays a key role in making recommendations to the COP on scientific and technical issues. It provides assessments of the status of biological diversity and of various measures taken in accordance with Convention, and also gives recommendations to the Conference of the Parties, which may be endorsed in whole, in part or in modified form by the COPs. As of 2024 SBSTTA had met 26 times, with a 26th meeting taking place in Nairobi, Kenya in 2024.

=== Subsidiary Body on Implementation ===
In 2014, the Conference of the Parties to the Convention on Biological Diversity established the Subsidiary Body on Implementation (SBI) to replace the Ad Hoc Open-ended Working Group on Review of Implementation of the Convention. The four functions and core areas of work of SBI are: (a) review of progress in implementation; (b) strategic actions to enhance implementation; (c) strengthening means of implementation; and (d) operations of the Convention and the Protocols. The first meeting of the SBI was held on 2–6 May 2016 and the second meeting was held on 9–13 July 2018, both in Montreal, Canada. The latest (fifth) meeting of the SBI was held in October 2024 in Cali, Colombia. The Bureau of the Conference of the Parties serves as the Bureau of the SBI. The current chair of the SBI is Ms. Clarissa Souza Della Nina of Brazil.

== Parties ==
Parties to the convention Signed, but not ratified Non-signatory

As of 2016, the Convention has 196 Parties, which includes 195 states and the European Union. All UN member states—with the exception of the United States—have ratified the treaty. The United States did not ratify the Convention due to concerns over national sovereignty and economic interests. This is because the country did not agree with the rules about sharing genetic resources and benefits like biotechnology and pharmaceuticals. Another concern was grounded around the idea that the Convention on Biological Diversity would interfere with domestic laws related to environmental regulations in the future. Non-UN member states that have ratified are the Cook Islands, Niue, and the State of Palestine. The Holy See and the states with limited recognition are non-Parties. The US has signed but not ratified the treaty, because ratification requires a two-thirds majority in the Senate and is blocked by Republican Party senators.

The European Union created the Cartagena Protocol (see below) in 2000 to enhance biosafety regulation and propagate the "precautionary principle" over the "sound science principle" defended by the United States. Whereas the impact of the Cartagena Protocol on domestic regulations has been substantial, its impact on international trade law remains uncertain. In 2006, the World Trade Organization (WTO) ruled that the European Union had violated international trade law between 1999 and 2003 by imposing a moratorium on the approval of genetically modified organisms (GMO) imports. Disappointing the United States, the panel nevertheless "decided not to decide" by not invalidating the stringent European biosafety regulations.

Implementation by the Parties to the Convention is achieved using two means:

=== National Biodiversity Strategies and Action Plans (NBSAP) ===
National Biodiversity Strategies and Action Plans (NBSAP) are the principal instruments for implementing the Convention at the national level. The Convention requires that countries prepare a national biodiversity strategy and to ensure that this strategy is included in planning for activities in all sectors where diversity may be impacted. As of early 2012, 173 Parties had developed NBSAPs.

The United Kingdom, New Zealand and Tanzania carried out elaborate responses to conserve individual species and specific habitats. The United States of America, a signatory who had not yet ratified the treaty by 2010, produced one of the most thorough implementation programs through species recovery programs and other mechanisms long in place in the US for species conservation.

Singapore established a detailed National Biodiversity Strategy and Action Plan. The National Biodiversity Centre of Singapore represents Singapore in the Convention for Biological Diversity.

=== National Reports ===
In accordance with Article 26 of the Convention, Parties prepare national reports on the status of implementation of the Convention.

== Protocols and plans developed by CBD ==
=== Cartagena Protocol (2000) ===
The Cartagena Protocol on Biosafety, also known as the Biosafety Protocol, was adopted in January 2000, after a CBD Open-ended Ad Hoc Working Group on Biosafety had met six times between July 1996 and February 1999. The Working Group submitted a draft text of the Protocol for consideration by Conference of the Parties at its first extraordinary meeting, which was convened for the express purpose of adopting a protocol on biosafety to the Convention on Biological Diversity. After a few delays, the Cartagena Protocol was eventually adopted on 29 January 2000. The Biosafety Protocol seeks to protect biological diversity from the potential risks posed by living modified organisms resulting from modern biotechnology.

The Biosafety Protocol makes clear that products from new technologies must be based on the precautionary principle and allow developing nations to balance public health against economic benefits. It will, for example, let countries ban imports of a genetically modified organism if they feel there is not enough scientific evidence the product is safe and requires exporters to label shipments containing genetically modified commodities such as corn or cotton.

The required number of 50 instruments of ratification/accession/approval/acceptance by countries was reached in May 2003. In accordance with the provisions of its Article 37, the Protocol entered into force on 11 September 2003.

=== Global Strategy for Plant Conservation (2002) ===
In April 2002, the Parties of the UN CBD adopted the recommendations of the Gran Canaria Declaration Calling for a Global Plant Conservation Strategy, and adopted a 16-point plan aiming to slow the rate of plant extinctions around the world by 2010.

=== Nagoya Protocol (2010) ===
The Nagoya Protocol on Access to Genetic Resources and the Fair and Equitable Sharing of Benefits Arising from their Utilization to the Convention on Biological Diversity was adopted on 29 October 2010 in Nagoya, Aichi Prefecture, Japan, at the tenth meeting of the Conference of the Parties, and entered into force on 12 October 2014. The protocol is a supplementary agreement to the Convention on Biological Diversity, and provides a transparent legal framework for the effective implementation of one of the three objectives of the CBD: the fair and equitable sharing of benefits arising out of the utilization of genetic resources. It thereby contributes to the conservation and sustainable use of biodiversity.

=== Strategic Plan for Biodiversity 2011–2020 ===
Also, at the tenth meeting of the Conference of the Parties, held from 18 to 29 October 2010 in Nagoya, a revised and updated "Strategic Plan for Biodiversity, 2011–2020" was agreed and published. This document included the "Aichi Biodiversity Targets", comprising 20 targets that address each of five strategic goals defined in the plan. The strategic plan includes the following strategic goals:

- Strategic Goal A: Address the underlying causes of biodiversity loss by mainstreaming biodiversity across government and society
- Strategic Goal B: Reduce the direct pressures on biodiversity and promote sustainable use
- Strategic Goal C: To improve the status of biodiversity by safeguarding ecosystems, species and genetic diversity
- Strategic Goal D: Enhance the benefits to all from biodiversity and ecosystem services
- Strategic Goal E: Enhance implementation through participatory planning, knowledge management and capacity building

Upon the launch of Agenda 2030, CBD released a technical note mapping and identifying synergies between the 17 Sustainable Development Goals (SDGs) and the 20 Aichi Biodiversity Targets. This helps to understand the contributions of biodiversity to achieving the SDGs.

=== Post-2020 Global Biodiversity Framework ===
A new plan, known as the post-2020 Global Biodiversity Framework (GBF) was developed to guide action through 2030. A first draft of this framework was released in July 2021, and its final content was discussed and negotiated as part of the COP 15 meetings. Reducing agricultural pollution and sharing the benefits of digital sequence information arose as key points of contention among Parties during development of the framework. A final version was adopted by the Convention on 19 December 2022. The framework includes a number of ambitious goals, including a commitment to designate at least 30 percent of global land and sea as protected areas (known as the "30 by 30" initiative).

=== Marine and coastal biodiversity ===
The CBD has a significant focus on marine and coastal biodiversity. A series of expert workshops have been held (2018–2022) to identify options for modifying the description of Ecologically or Biologically Significant Marine Areas (EBSAs) and describing new areas. These have focused on the North-East, North-West and South-Eastern Atlantic Ocean, Baltic Sea, Caspian Sea, Black Sea, Seas of East Asia, North-West Indian Ocean and Adjacent Gulf Areas, Southern and North-East Indian Ocean, Mediterranean Sea, North and South Pacific, Eastern Tropical and Temperate Pacific, Wider Caribbean and Western Mid-Atlantic. The workshop meetings have followed the EBSA process based on internationally agreed scientific criteria. This is aimed at creating an international legally binding instrument (ILBI) under UNCLOS to support the conservation and sustainable use of marine biological diversity beyond areas of national jurisdiction (BBNJ or High Seas Treaty). The central mechanism is area-based planning and decision-making. It integrates EBSAs, Vulnerable Marine Ecosystems (VMEs) and High Seas (Marine Protected Areas) with Blue Growth scenarios. There is also linkage with the EU Marine Strategy Framework Directive.

== Criticism ==
There have been criticisms of the CBD that its implementation has been weakened due to resistance of Western countries to the implementation of pro-South provisions of the Convention. For instance, Brazil argued that despite having most of the world's biodiversity, they receive a lack of financial and technological support from wealthier countries to conserve resources. They argued that developed countries benefit from access to resources, but fail to provide funding. CBD is also regarded as a case of a hard treaty gone soft in the implementation trajectory. The argument to enforce the treaty as a legally binding multilateral instrument with the Conference of Parties reviewing the infractions and non-compliance is also gaining strength. Due to the lack of strict enforcement, countries do not face penalties when they overlook the Convention, undermining its effectiveness. The Convention needs go beyond national self-reporting and voluntary commitment to stronger enforcement, accountability, and clearer rules to ensure that biodiversity is protected.

Although the Convention explicitly states that all forms of life are covered by its provisions, examination of reports and of national biodiversity strategies and action plans submitted by participating countries shows that in practice this is not happening. The fifth report of the European Union, for example, makes frequent reference to animals (particularly fish) and plants, but does not mention bacteria, fungi or protists at all. The International Society for Fungal Conservation has assessed more than 100 of these CBD documents for their coverage of fungi using defined criteria to place each in one of six categories. No documents were assessed as good or adequate, less than 10% as nearly adequate or poor, and the rest as deficient, seriously deficient or totally deficient.

Scientists working with biodiversity and medical research are expressing fears that the Nagoya Protocol is counterproductive, and will hamper disease prevention and conservation efforts, and that the threat of imprisonment of scientists will have a chilling effect on research. Non-commercial researchers and institutions such as natural history museums fear maintaining biological reference collections and exchanging material between institutions will become difficult, and medical researchers have expressed alarm at plans to expand the protocol to make it illegal to publicly share genetic information, e.g. via GenBank.

William Yancey Brown, when with the Brookings Institution, suggested that the Convention on Biological Diversity should include the preservation of intact genomes and viable cells for every known species and for new species as they are discovered.

== Meetings of the Parties ==
A Conference of the Parties (COP) was held annually for three years after 1994, and thence biennially on even-numbered years.

COP	Year	Country	Begin	End	Days	City	Link
1	1994	Bahamas	28.11.1994	09.12.1994	12	Nassau	COP 1
2	1995	Indonesia	06.11.1995	17.11.1995	12	Jakarta	COP 2
3	1996	Argentina	04.11.1996	15.11.1996	12	Buenos Aires	COP 3
4	1998	Slovakia	04.05.1998	15.05.1998	12	Bratislava	COP 4
5	2000	Kenya	15.05.2000	26.05.2000	12	Nairobi	COP 5
6	2002	Netherlands	07.04.2002	19.04.2002	13	The Hague	COP 6
7	2004	Malaysia	09.02.2004	20.02.2004	12	Kuala Lumpur	COP 7
8	2006	Brazil	20.03.2006	31.03.2006	12	Curitiba	COP 8
9	2008	Germany	19.05.2008	30.05.2008	12	Bonn	COP 9
10	2010	Japan	18.10.2010	29.10.2010	12	Nagoya	COP 10
11	2012	India	08.10.2012	19.10.2012	12	Hyderabad	COP 11
12	2014	South Korea	06.10.2014	17.10.2014	12	Pyeongchang	COP 12
13	2016	Mexico	04.12.2016	17.12.2016	14	Cancún	COP 13
14	2018	Egypt	13.11.2018	29.11.2018	17	Sharm El Sheik	COP 14
15	2022	Canada	07.12.2022	19.12.2022	13	Montreal	COP 15
16	2024	Colombia	21.10.2024	01.11.2024	12	Cali	COP 16
17	2026	Armenia	19.10.2026	30.10.2026	12	Yerevan	COP 17

=== 1994 COP 1 ===
The first ordinary meeting of the Parties to the Convention took place in November and December 1994, in Nassau, Bahamas. The International Coral Reef Initiative (ICRI) was launched at this first COP for the Convention on Biological Diversity.

=== 1995 COP 2 ===
The second ordinary meeting of the Parties to the Convention took place in November 1995, in Jakarta, Indonesia.

=== 1996 COP 3 ===
The third ordinary meeting of the Parties to the Convention took place in November 1996, in Buenos Aires, Argentina.

=== 1998 COP 4 ===
The fourth ordinary meeting of the Parties to the Convention took place in May 1998, in Bratislava, Slovakia.

=== 1999 EX-COP 1 (Cartagena) ===
The First Extraordinary Meeting of the Conference of the Parties took place in February 1999, in Cartagena, Colombia. A series of meetings led to the adoption of the Cartagena Protocol on Biosafety in January 2000, effective from 2003.

=== 2000 COP 5 ===
The fifth ordinary meeting of the Parties to the Convention took place in May 2000, in Nairobi, Kenya.

=== 2002 COP 6 ===
The sixth ordinary meeting of the Parties to the Convention took place in April 2002, in The Hague, Netherlands.

=== 2004 COP 7 ===
The seventh ordinary meeting of the Parties to the Convention took place in February 2004, in Kuala Lumpur, Malaysia.

=== 2006 COP 8 ===
The eighth ordinary meeting of the Parties to the Convention took place in March 2006, in Curitiba, Brazil.

=== 2008 COP 9 ===
The ninth ordinary meeting of the Parties to the Convention took place in May 2008, in Bonn, Germany.

=== 2010 COP 10 (Nagoya) ===
The tenth ordinary meeting of the Parties to the Convention took place in October 2010, in Nagoya, Japan. It was at this meeting that the Nagoya Protocol was ratified.

2010 was the International Year of Biodiversity, which resulted in 110 reports on the loss of biodiversity in different countries, but little or no progress toward the goal of "significant reduction" in the problem. Following a recommendation of CBD signatories, the UN declared 2011 to 2020 as the United Nations Decade on Biodiversity.

=== 2012 COP 11 ===
Leading up to the Conference of the Parties (COP 11) meeting on biodiversity in Hyderabad, India, 2012, preparations for a World Wide Views on Biodiversity has begun, involving old and new partners and building on the experiences from the World Wide Views on Global Warming.

=== 2014 COP 12 ===
Under the theme, "Biodiversity for Sustainable Development", thousands of representatives of governments, NGOs, indigenous peoples, scientists and the private sector gathered in Pyeongchang, Republic of Korea in October 2014 for the 12th meeting of the Conference of the Parties to the Convention on Biological Diversity (COP 12).

From 6–17 October 2014, Parties discussed the implementation of the Strategic Plan for Biodiversity 2011–2020 and its Aichi Biodiversity Targets, which are to be achieved by the end of this decade. The results of Global Biodiversity Outlook 4, the flagship assessment report of the CBD informed the discussions.

The conference gave a mid-term evaluation to the UN Decade on Biodiversity (2011–2020) initiative, which aims to promote the conservation and sustainable use of nature. The meeting achieved a total of 35 decisions, including a decision on "Mainstreaming gender considerations", to incorporate gender perspective to the analysis of biodiversity.

At the end of the meeting, the meeting adopted the "Pyeongchang Road Map", which addresses ways to achieve biodiversity through technology cooperation, funding and strengthening the capacity of developing countries.

=== 2016 COP 13 ===
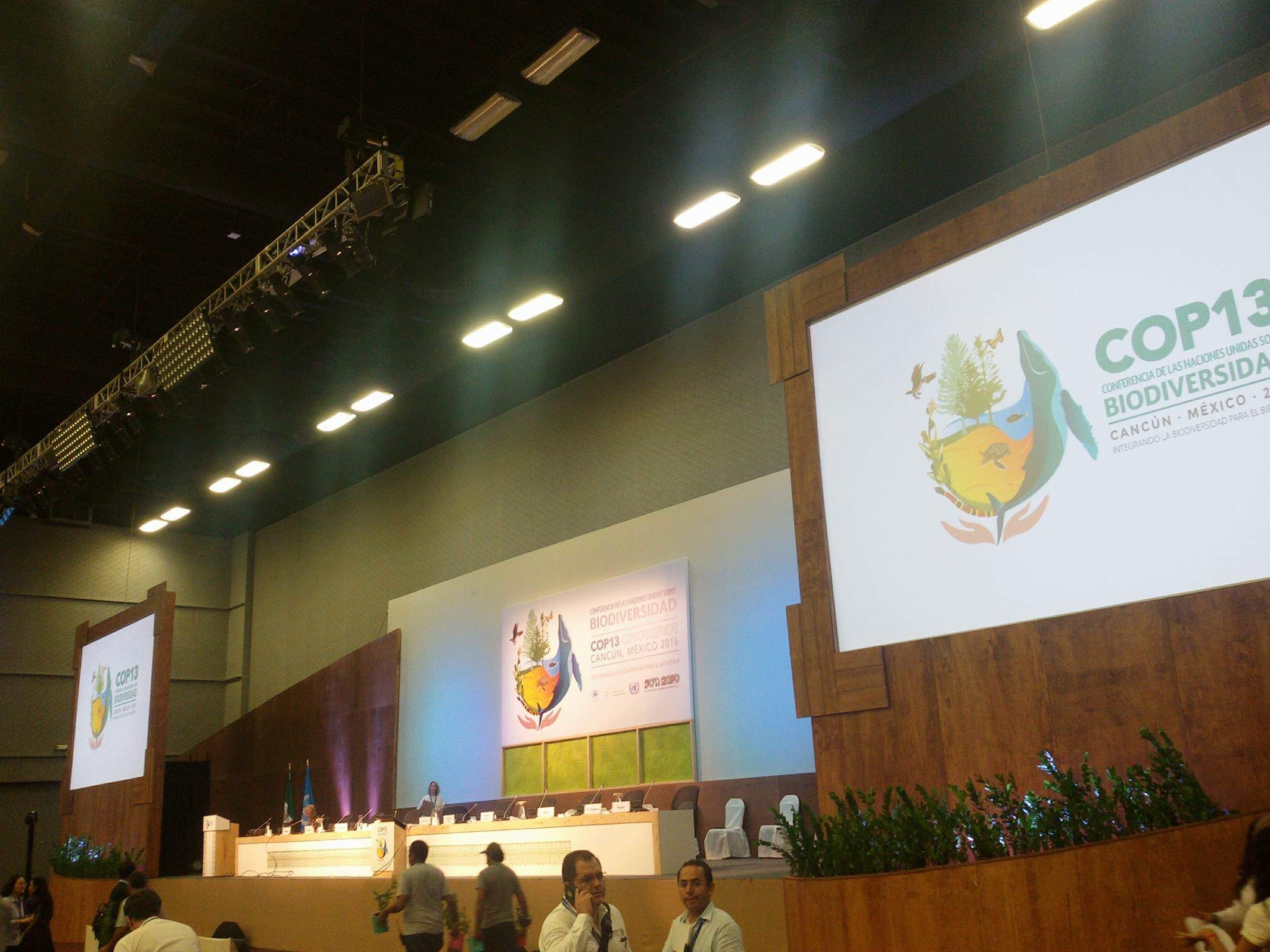
COP13 Mexico meeting

The thirteenth ordinary meeting of the Parties to the Convention took place between 2 and 17 December 2016 in Cancún, Mexico.

=== 2018 COP 14 ===
The 14th ordinary meeting of the Parties to the Convention took place on 17–29 November 2018, in Sharm El-Sheikh, Egypt. The 2018 UN Biodiversity Conference closed on 29 November 2018 with broad international agreement on reversing the global destruction of nature and biodiversity loss threatening all forms of life on Earth. Parties adopted the Voluntary Guidelines for the design and effective implementation of ecosystem-based approaches to climate change adaptation and disaster risk reduction. Governments also agreed to accelerate action to achieve the Aichi Biodiversity Targets, agreed in 2010, until 2020. Work to achieve these targets would take place at the global, regional, national and subnational levels.

=== 2021/2022 COP 15 ===
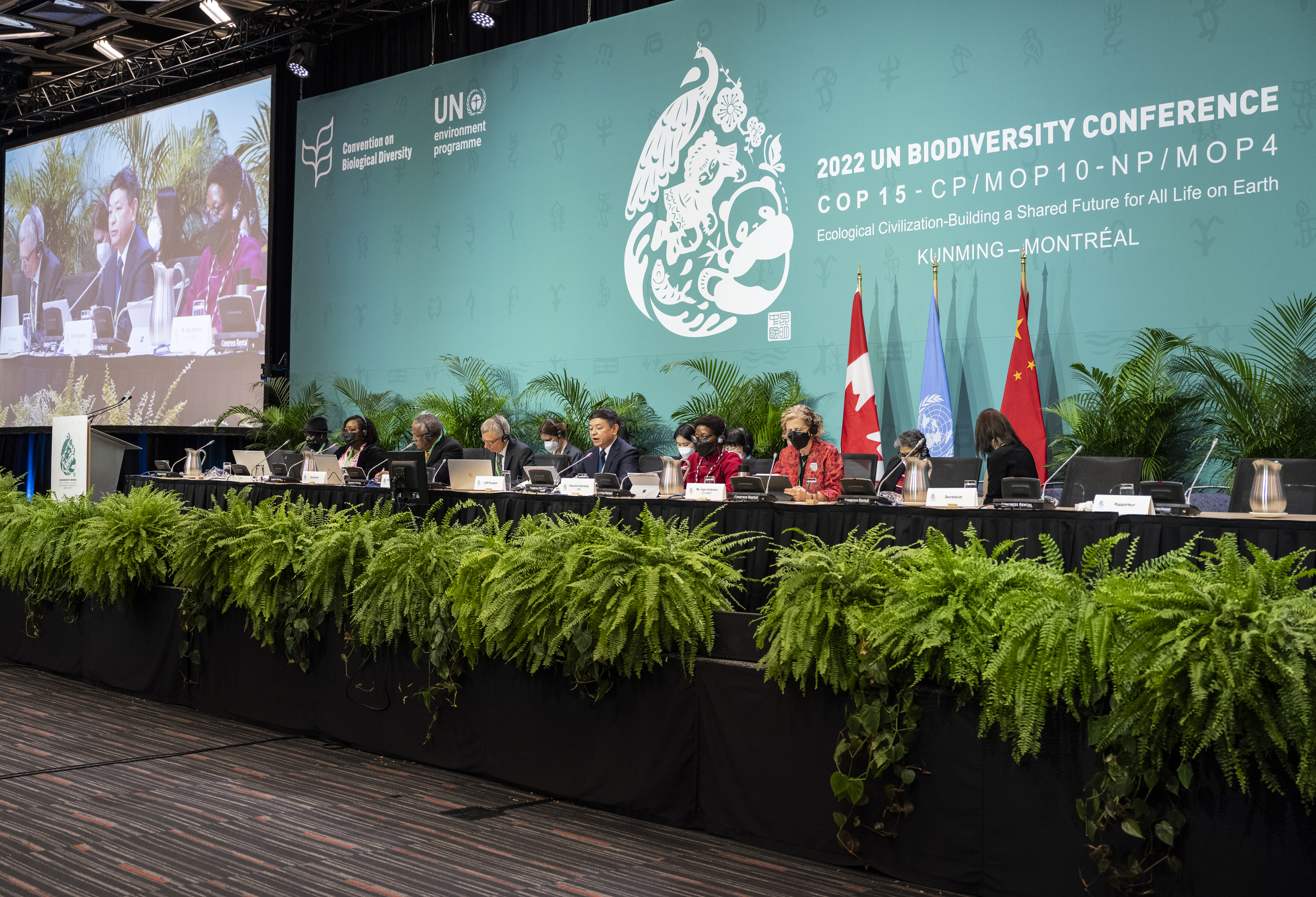
COP15 Canada meeting

The 15th meeting of the Parties was originally scheduled to take place in Kunming, China in 2020, but was postponed several times due to the COVID-19 pandemic. After the start date was delayed for a third time, the Convention was split into two sessions. A mostly online event took place in October 2021, where over 100 nations signed the Kunming declaration on biodiversity. The theme of the declaration was "Ecological Civilization: Building a Shared Future for All Life on Earth". Twenty-one action-oriented draft targets were provisionally agreed in the October meeting, to be further discussed in the second session: an in-person event that was originally scheduled to start in April 2022, but was rescheduled to occur later in 2022. The second part of COP 15 ultimately took place in Montreal, Canada, from 5–17 December 2022. At the meeting, the Parties to the Convention adopted a new action plan, the Kunming-Montreal Global Biodiversity Framework.

=== 2024 COP 16 ===
The 16th meeting of the Parties was held in Cali, Colombia in 2024. Originally, Turkey was going to host it but after a series of earthquakes in February 2023 they had to withdraw.

=== 2026 COP 17 ===
The 17th meeting of the Conference of the Parties to the Convention on Biological Diversity (COP17) took place in Yerevan, Armenia, from 18–30 October 2026. Parties adopted the Yerevan Declaration and agreed on further steps to accelerate implementation of the global biodiversity targets.

=== 2028 COP 18 ===
The 18th meeting of the Conference of the Parties (COP18) is scheduled to take place in Ecuador, in the last quarter of 2028.

== See also ==
- 2010 Biodiversity Indicators Partnership
- 2010 Biodiversity Target
- 30 by 30
- Agreement on Trade-Related Aspects of Intellectual Property Rights (TRIPs)
- Biodiversity banking
- Biological Diversity Act, 2002
- Biopiracy
- Bioprospecting
- Biosphere Reserve
- Convention on the Conservation of Migratory Species of Wild Animals
- Convention on the International Trade in Endangered Species of Wild Flora and Fauna
- Convention on Wetlands of International Importance, especially as Waterfowl Habitat
- Ecotourism
- Endangered species
- Endangered Species Recovery Plan
- Environmental agreements
- Environmental Modification Convention, another ban on weather modification / climate engineering.
- Globally Important Agricultural Heritage Systems (GIAHS)
- Green Development Initiative (GDI)
- Holocene extinction
- Intergovernmental Science-Policy Platform on Biodiversity and Ecosystem Services
- International Cooperative Biodiversity Groups
- International Organization for Biological Control
- International Treaty on Plant Genetic Resources for Food and Agriculture
- International Day for Biological Diversity
- International Year of Biodiversity
- Kunming-Montreal Global Biodiversity Framework
- Migratory Bird Treaty Act of 1918
- Red Data Book of Singapore
- Red Data Book of the Russian Federation
- Satoyama
- Sustainable forest management
- United Nations Convention to Combat Desertification
- United Nations Decade on Biodiversity
- United Nations Framework Convention on Climate Change
- World Conservation Monitoring Centre
