= Biodiversity Indicators Partnership =

Biodiversity Indicators Partnership Logo

The Biodiversity Indicators Partnership (BIP) brings together a host of international organizations working on indicator development, to provide the best available information on biodiversity trends to the global community. The Partnership was initially established to help monitor progress towards the Convention on Biological Diversity (CBD) 2010 Biodiversity target. However, since its establishment in 2006 the BIP has developed a strong identity not only within the CBD but with other Multilateral Environmental Agreements (MEAs), national and regional governments and other sectors. As a result, the Partnership will continue through international collaboration and cooperation to provide biodiversity indicator information and trends into the future.

== Current status ==
The Partnership is expanding in breadth and knowledge to ensure that it can play central role in a range of processes over the course of the coming decade, including supporting the United Nations Conference on Sustainable Development (Rio+20), the Millennium Development Goals (MDGs), the United Nations Convention to Combat Desertification (UNCCD), the Ramsar Convention on Wetlands, the United Nations Environment Programme and the Intergovernmental Science-Policy Platform on Biodiversity and Ecosystem Services (IPBES). Central to the renewed Partnership will be its revitalized relationship with the Convention on Biological Diversity. In 2010, at the 10th Conference of the Parties to the CBD held in Nagoya, Japan the BIP was referenced eight times in the official adopted decisions. These references demonstrated a clear will for the Partnership to continue supporting the CBD with implementation of the Strategic Plan for Biodiversity 2011–2020. The Strategic Plan consists of 20 new biodiversity targets for 2020, termed the ‘Aichi Biodiversity Targets’.

== Background ==
Biodiversity encompasses the entire variety of life on Earth. It is vital for human survival and is a key measure of the health of our planet. Human activities are irreversibly impacting biodiversity. In all regions of the world species extinction rates have increased, ecosystems have been degraded, and genetic diversity has declined.

In response to this situation, the international community agreed "to achieve by 2010 a significant reduction of the current rate of biodiversity loss at global, regional and national level as a contribution to poverty alleviation and to the benefit of all life on Earth." This '2010 Biodiversity Target' was adopted by governments in 2002 at the 6th Conference of the Parties (COP 6) of the Convention on Biological Diversity (CBD).

An essential part of reaching the 2010 biodiversity target was being able to measure and communicate progress. For this purpose the CBD adopted a framework in 2004, which included the use of a range of biodiversity indicators to measure progress towards the 2010 target. In 2006 this framework was further elaborated and the '2010 Biodiversity Indicators Partnership was established, as a global initiative to further develop and promote indicators for the consistent monitoring and assessment of biodiversity. The 2010 BIP was established with major support from the Global Environment Facility (GEF).

== Objectives ==
The main objective of the Partnership is a reduction in the rate of biodiversity loss at the global level, through improved decisions for the conservation of global biodiversity. In order to meet this objective the key outcomes of the BIP are:

1. The generation of information on biodiversity trends which is useful to decision makers;
2. To ensure improved global indicators are implemented and available;
3. To establish links between biodiversity initiatives at the national and regional levels to enable capacity building and improve the delivery of the biodiversity indicators.

== Biodiversity indicators ==
Through CBD governance and advisory bodies, the global biodiversity community identified a suite of 17 headline indicators from the seven focal areas for assessing progress towards, and communicating the 2010 target at a global level.

Since 2007, partners have worked to ensure the most accurate information is available to decision makers. The BIP indicators have substantially contributed to the 3rd edition of the Global Biodiversity Outlook, featuring in the Status and Trends in Biodiversity chapter of this flagship CBD publication.

The Partnership also works to integrate indicator results into coherent, compelling storylines giving a more understandable picture of the status of biodiversity.

| Focal areas | Headline indicators |
|---|---|
| Status and trends of the components of biodiversity | Trends in extent of selected biomes, ecosystems and habitats Trends in abundance and distribution of selected species Coverage of protected areas Change in status of threatened species Trends in genetic diversity |
| Sustainable Use | Proportion of products derived from sustainable sources Ecological Footprint and related concepts |
| Threats to Biodiversity | Nitrogen Deposition; Invasive Alien Species |
| Ecosystem integrity and ecosystem goods and services | Marine Trophic Index; Water Quality; Connectivity/fragmentation of ecosystems Health and well being of communities Biodiversity for food and medicine |
| Status of traditional knowledge, innovations and practices | Status and trends of linguistic diversity and numbers of speakers of indigenous languages |
| Status of access and benefit sharing | To be determined |
| Status of resource transfers | Official development assistance provided in support of the Convention |

== Partners ==
The Partnership brings together a host of international organisations working to support the regular delivery of biodiversity indicators at the global, national and regional levels.

Partners of the BIP can be separated into the following categories:

| STEERING COMMITTEE Advise on the general direction of the BIP project, and review and provide advice on key outputs | KEY INDICATOR PARTNERS Develop and implement the biodiversity indicators | ASSOCIATE INDICATOR PARTNERS Assist in the development and implementation of the indicator suite, and/or provide support to the Partnership | AFFILIATE PARTNERS Work towards similar aims and objectives as the BIP, although at different scales |
|---|---|---|---|
| Secretariat of the Convention on Biological Diversity(CBD); European Environment Agency(EEA); Food and Agriculture Organization of the United Nations (FAO); Global Environment Facility (GEF); International Union for Conservation of Nature(IUCN); Ramsar Convention on Wetlands; United Nations Environment Programme (UNEP); United Nations Environment Programme World Conservation Monitoring Centre (UNEP WCMC) | Bioversity International; BirdLife International; Conservation International (CI); Food and Agriculture Organization of the United Nations (FAO); Global Footprint Network (GFN); Global Invasive Species Programme (GISP); Institute of Zoology, Zoological Society of London (ZSL); International Nitrogen Initiative (INI); IUCN Species Survival Commission (IUCN SSC); IUCN Sustainable Use Specialist Group; IUCN World Commission on Protected Areas (IUCN WCPA); Organisation for Economic Co-operation and Development (OECD); Royal Society for the Protection of Birds (RSPB); Sea Around Us Project; The Nature Conservancy (TNC); TRAFFIC International; Union for Ethical BioTrade (UEBT); University of British Columbia UBC Fisheries Centre; United Nations Educational, Scientific and Cultural Organization (UNESCO); UNEP Global Environmental Monitoring System (GEMS) Water Programme; United Nations Environment Programme World Conservation Monitoring Centre (UNEP-WCMC); University of Queensland, Australia; Wetlands International; World Health Organization (WHO); World Wide Fund for Nature WWF | Convention on Migratory Species (CMS); Global Biodiversity Information Facility (GBIF); International Council on Mining and Metals (ICMM); Global Land Cover Facility, NASA/NGO Biodiversity Working Group; Ramsar Convention on Wetlands; Terralingua; United Nations Environment Programme (UNEP); Wildlife Conservation Society (WCS) | ASEAN Centre for Biodiversity; Biotrade Initiative; Center for International Earth Science Information Network; Countdown 2010; Circumpolar Biodiversity Monitoring Program (CBMP); Global Reporting Initiative; International Indigenous Forum on Biodiversity; International Centre for Integrated Mountain Development (ICIMOD); Land Degradation Assessment in Drylands (LADA); NorBio2010; PROMEBIO: A Regional Strategic Biodiversity Monitoring and Evaluation Program for Central America; Streamlining European 2010 Biodiversity Indicators (SEBI2010); The Economics of Ecosystems and Biodiversity (TEEB); United Nations University – The Institute for Water, Environment and Health; Tour du valat Water Footprint Network |

== Establishing links ==
The BIP works to communicate links between the partnership’s work and all potential users, including highlighting the utility of the components of the CBD indicator suite for other multilateral environmental agreements. The BIP has presented results and hosted events at major international meetings of the following MEAs: the Convention on Biological Diversity (CBD), the United Nations Convention to Combat Desertification (UNCCD), the International Treaty on Plant Genetic Resources for Food and Agriculture (ITPGRFA), the Convention on Migratory Species (CMS) and the Ramsar Convention on Wetlands. Engagement with the private sector is also an objective for the partnership. The BIP has provided financial support and currently provides ongoing technical support to the Global Reporting Initiative (GRI), to advance the integration of related indicators into corporate performance measures.

== Regional and national indicator support and development ==
In addition to improving global-scale indicators, the BIP has been actively involved in supporting national and regional initiatives; facilitating indicator development and implementation that responds to country-specific national biodiversity priorities. A programme of capacity building workshops has been run across the globe, bringing together the various institutional representatives involved in national indicator development to share experiences and best-practice. Some 45 countries have been engaged to date.

A series of guidance documents on national indicator development have been published, together with a web portal (www.bipnational.net). This multi-language website is the most comprehensive online resource of guidance, support and shared experiences of effective indicator development for countries and regions looking to develop biodiversity indicators.

Guidance Documents:

- Guidance for National Biodiversity Indicator Development and Use
- Biodiversity Indicators capacity Strengthening: experiences from Africa
- Wild Bird Index: Guidance for national and regional use
- Coverage of Protected Areas: Guidance for national and regional use
- IUCN Red List Index: Guidance for national and regional use
- Living Planet Index: Guidance for national and regional use

== See also ==
- Living Planet Index
