= International Year of Biodiversity =

2010 UN theme year

Official logo

The International Year of Biodiversity (IYB) was a year-long celebration of biological diversity and its importance, taking place internationally in 2010. Coinciding with the date of the 2010 Biodiversity Target, the year was declared by the 61st session of the United Nations General Assembly in 2006.

It was meant to help raise awareness the importance of biodiversity through activities and events, to influence decision makers, and "to elevate biological diversity nearer to the top of the political agenda".

== Background ==
The United Nations General Assembly declared 2010 as the International Year of Biodiversity (Resolution 61/203). This year coincided with the 2010 Biodiversity Target adopted by the Parties to the Convention on Biological Diversity and by Heads of State and government at the World Summit for Sustainable Development in Johannesburg in 2002.

The Secretariat of the Convention on Biological Diversity (CBD), based in Montreal, Canada, was coordinating the International Year of Biodiversity campaign.

Established at the Earth Summit in Rio de Janeiro in 1992, the Convention on Biological Diversity is an international treaty for the conservation and sustainable use of biodiversity and the equitable sharing of the benefits of biodiversity. The CBD has near-universal participation, with 193 Parties.

== Main goals in UN view ==
The main goals of the International Year of Biodiversity were to:

- Enhance public awareness of the importance of conserving biodiversity and of the underlying threats to biodiversity
- Raise awareness of the accomplishments to save biodiversity that had been realized by communities and governments
- Promote innovative solutions to reduce the threats to biodiversity
- Encourage individuals, organizations and governments to act immediately to halt biodiversity loss
- Start dialog between stakeholders for what to do in the post-2010 period

=== Slogan ===
Biodiversity is life. Biodiversity is our life.

== See also ==
- United Nations Decade on Biodiversity (2011–20)
- International Year of Forests (2011)
- Convention on Biological Diversity COP10 Nagoya Protocol (2010)
- 2010 in science
