= International Year of Forests =

2011 United Nations observance

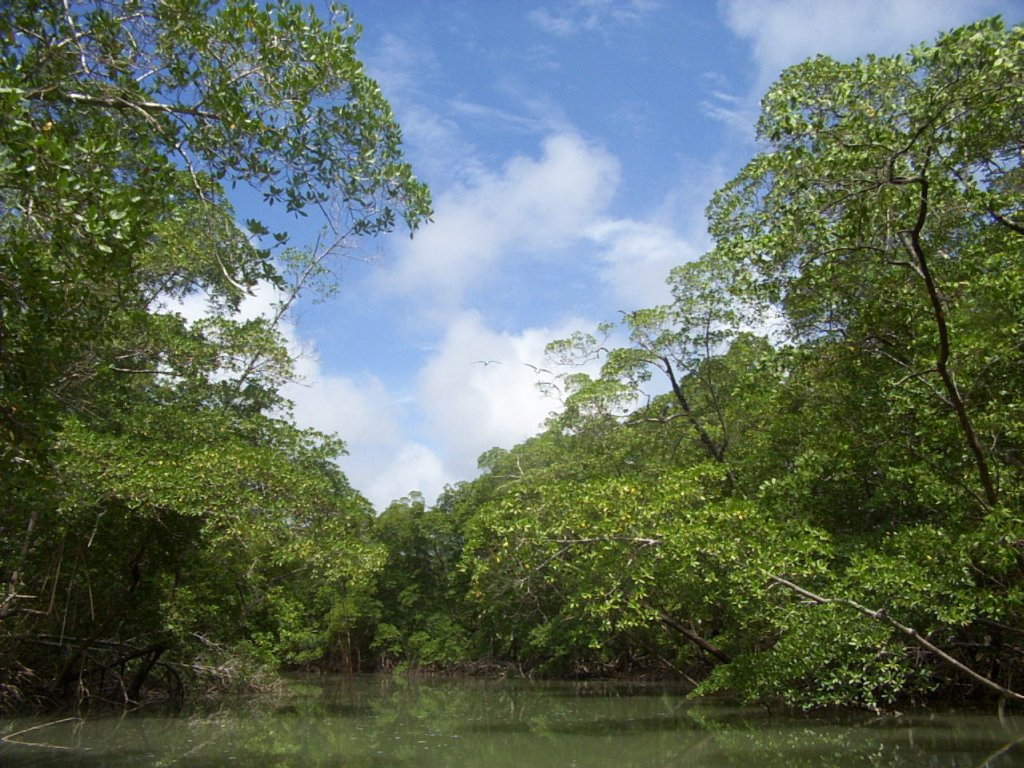
The Amazon rainforest in Brazil

The year 2011 was declared the International Year of Forests by the United Nations to raise awareness and strengthen the sustainable management, conservation and sustainable development of all types of forests for the benefit of current and future generations.

== Background ==
Forests are an integral part of global sustainable development. According to World Bank estimates, more than 1.6 billion people depend on forests for their livelihoods with some 300 million living in them. The forest product industry is a source of economic growth and employment, with global forest products traded internationally is estimated at $327 billion.

The UN's Food and Agriculture Organization (FAO) estimates that every year 130,000 km^{2} (50,000 sq mi) of the world's forests are lost due to deforestation. Conversion to agricultural land, unsustainable harvesting of timber, unsound land management practices, and creation of human settlements are the most common reasons for this loss of forested areas.

According to the World Bank, deforestation accounts for up to 20 percent of the global greenhouse gas emissions that contribute to global warming. FAO data estimates that the world's forests and forest soil store more than one trillion tons of carbon – twice the amount found in the atmosphere. The World Bank estimates that forests provide habitats to about two-thirds of all species on earth, and that deforestation of closed tropical rainforests could account for biodiversity loss of as many as 100 species a day.

According to the International Union for Conservation of Nature (IUCN) and the Global Partnership on Forest Landscape Restoration, "Across the globe lie more than a billion hectares of lost and degraded forest land that could be restored".

== Campaign ==
The Secretariat of the United Nations Forum on Forests is the focal point for implementation of the International Year in collaboration with Governments, the Collaborative Partnership on Forests and other relevant organizations and processes.

Governments, regional and international organizations and civil society organizations are expected to create national committees and designate focal points in their respective countries to facilitate organization of activities in support of the International Year of Forests.

== Celebrations ==
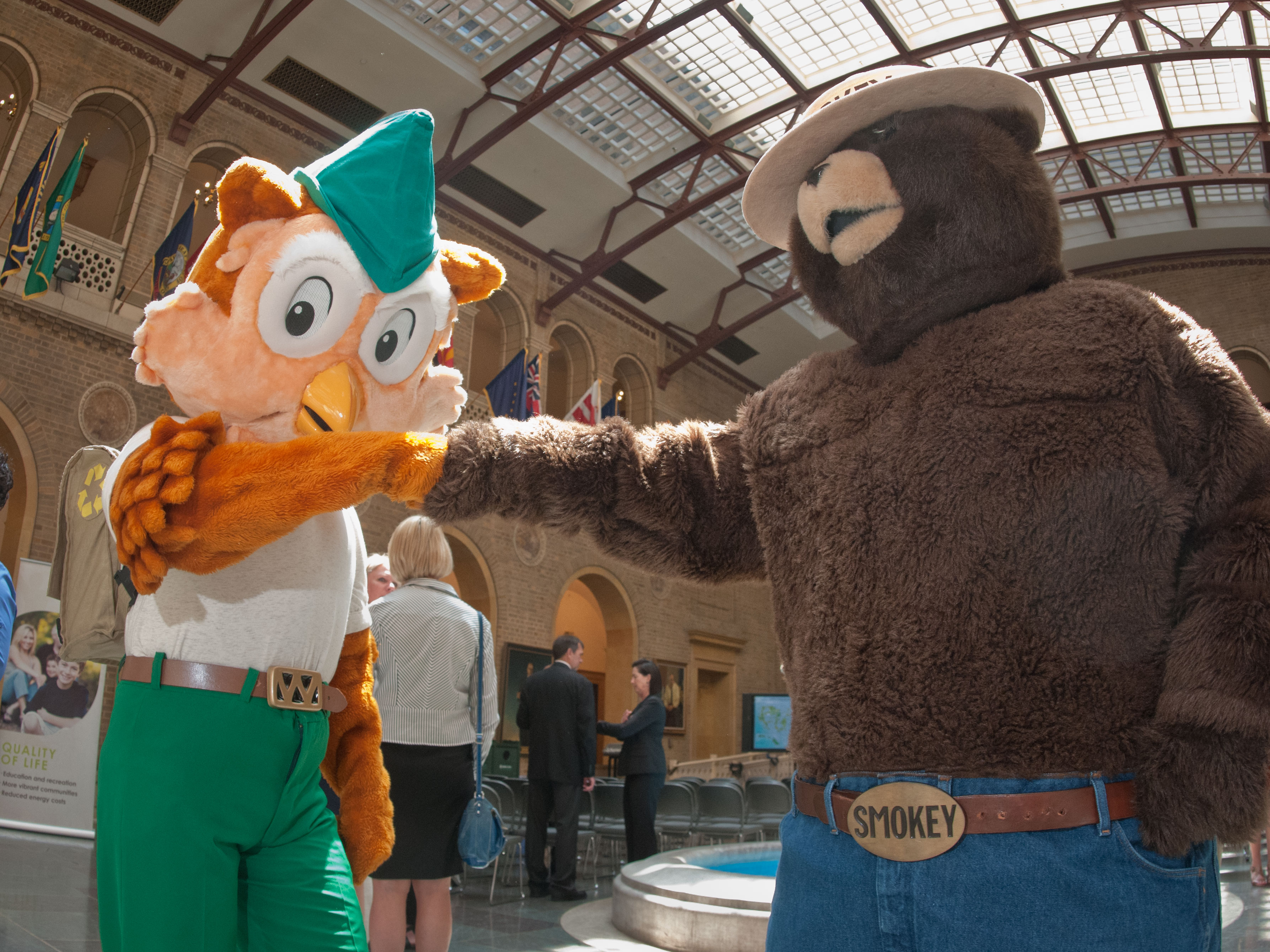
Woodsy Owl and Smokey Bear give each other a fist bump at the International Year of Forests celebration for U.S. Department of Agriculture employees, on Friday, 3 June 2011 in the patio of the Whitten Building, Washington, D.C.

The "Celebrate Forests. Celebrate Life." campaign is the official U.S. celebration. Coordinated by the National Association of State Foresters in partnership with the U.S. Forest Service, the U.S. celebration aims to elevate awareness and understanding of the value of America's forests and showcase the connections between healthy forests, people, ecosystems and economies. The goal is to provide all forestry stakeholders with ideas and resources to participate in the celebration over the year.

On 9 February 2011, deputy director-general of Food and Agriculture Organization of the United Nations, Ann Tutwiler, and Assistant Director-General of the Forestry Department, Eduardo Rojas-Briales, launch the 2011 edition of the FAO flagship publication State of the World’s Forests (SOFO). The State of the World's Forests reports on the global status of forests, recent major policy and institutional developments and key issues concerning the forest sector.

On 9 March 2011, New Zealand's Minister of Forestry, Hon David Carter, launched the International Year of Forests at Parliament Buildings in Wellington, New Zealand. Hon Carter said, "They [forests] are an integral part of our natural resource-based economy, they provide a range of environmental benefits, and they have cultural significance".

On 5 May 2011, the Romanian Academy hosted a national debate regarding the "2011, the International Year of Forests".

On 15 July 2011, in honor of International Year of Forests, the New York State Department of Environmental Conservation (DEC) Division of Lands and Forests kicked off the Celebrating New York's Forests Photo Contest. This contest is an effort to increase awareness of and appreciation for all types of forests, urban and rural, large and small, public and privately owned, across the state.

== History ==
The UN General Assembly proclaimed 2011 as the "International Year of Forests" with Resolution 61/193 on 20 December 2006.

== See also ==
- International Year of Biodiversity
- United Nations Forum on Forests
- United Nations System
- International observance
- 2011 in science
