= International Cooperative Biodiversity Groups =

International Cooperative Biodiversity Groups (or ICBG) is a program under National Institutes of Health, National Science Foundation and USAID established in 1993 to promote collaborative research between American universities and research institutions in countries that harbor unique genetic resource in the form of biodiversity—the practice known as bioprospecting. The basic aim of the program is to benefit both the host community and the global scientific community by discovering and researching the possibilities for new solutions to human health problems based on previously unexplored genetic resources. It therefore seeks to conserve biodiversity, and to foment, encourage and support sustainable practices of usage of biological resources. Groups are headed by a principal investigator who coordinates the efforts of the research consortium which often has branches in the US and the host country as well as in the countries of other third party institutions. There are currently International Cooperative Biodiversity groups operating in Latin America, Africa, Asia and Papua-New Guinea. The Maya ICBG, a group dedicated to collecting the ethnobiological knowledge of the Maya population of Chiapas, Mexico led by Dr. Brent Berlin was closed in 2001 after two years of funding after accusations of having failed to obtain prior informed consent.
