= 2010 Biodiversity Target =

The 2010 Biodiversity Target was an overall conservation target aiming to halt the decline of biodiversity by the end of 2010. The world largely failed to meet the target.

== History of the 2010 Biodiversity Target ==
It was first adopted by EU Heads of State at the EU Summit in Gothenburg, Sweden, in June 2001. They decided that "biodiversity decline should be halted with the aim of reaching this objective by 2010".

One year later, the Convention on Biological Diversity's sixth Conference of the Parties adopted the Strategic Plan for the Convention in Decision VI/26. The Decision says "Parties commit themselves to a more effective and coherent implementation of the three objectives of the Convention, to achieve by 2010 a significant reduction of the current rate of biodiversity loss at the global, regional and national level as a contribution to poverty alleviation and to the benefit of all life on earth."

The World Summit on Sustainable Development held in Johannesburg in 2002 confirmed the 2010 Biodiversity Target and called for "the achievement by 2010 of a significant reduction in the current rate of loss of biological diversity".

In 2003, Environment Ministers and Heads of delegation from 51 countries in the United Nations Economic Commission for Europe (UNECE) region adopted the Kyiv Resolution on Biodiversity at the fifth Ministerial Conference "Environment for Europe" and decided to "reinforce our objective to halt the loss of biological diversity at all levels by the year 2010".

By the year 2006, the following nations have contributed extensively to establishment of individual Biodiversity Action Plans: Tanzania, New Zealand, Great Britain and the United States of America, called Species Recovery Plans in the USA.

== Progress at the European Level ==
The 2004 Irish Presidency held a major stakeholder conference on the 2010 Biodiversity Target which resulted in a detailed roadmap to 2010 called the "Message from Malahide". At the same time, a number of organisations joined to launch the initiative Countdown2010 to support progress towards the 2010 Biodiversity Target.

On May 22, 2006 the European Commission launched its Biodiversity Communication as an implementation tool to reach the 2010 Biodiversity Target.

== Progress at the Convention on Biological Diversity ==
Subsequent Convention on Biological Diversity (CBD) decisions went on to specify indicators (see: Biodiversity Indicators Partnership) for immediate testing and for possible use, and to further develop work programmes for implementation of the target.

== Challenges towards reaching the 2010 biodiversity target ==
This decision poses the question of how to measure the rate of biodiversity loss, in order to assess whether the target has been achieved by the nations who are party to the Convention.

== See also ==
- 2010 Biodiversity Indicators Partnership
- 2010 International Year of Biodiversity
- Aichi Biodiversity Targets
