= Li-Ron Choir =

Li-Ron Choir at the Choir Olympics

Li-Ron Choir (Hebrew: מקהלת לי-רון) is an Israeli award-winning choir. Its repertoire includes classical music, folk songs, Jewish and Israeli music.

== History ==
Li-Ron Choir was established in 1980 at the Gordon School in Herzliya by Ronit Shapira. The choir represents Herzliya both locally and abroad. The choir is composed of three groups: children between the ages of 6 and 11, teenagers from 12 to 18 and a vocal ensemble.

Participation in the choir has several goals: developing listening skills, honing the ability to process musical content and promoting tolerance and empathy.

Many Israeli composers, among them Sara Shoham, Andre Hajdu, Menachem Wiesenberg, Ovadia Tuvia, Moshe Rasiuk, Mary Even-or and Moshe Zorman, have written special choral works for the choir. Li-Ron performed the Yiddish song Oyf 'n Pripetshok for the sound track of Schindler's List.

== International competitions ==
Since 1991 the choir had participated in several international competitions:

- 1991 - Wales, England – gold medal
- 1995 - Budapest, Hungary – gold medal, 1st prize
- 1996 - Netanya, Israel – gold medal, 1st prize
- 1997 - Giessen, Germany – gold medal
- 1998 - Salsemaggiore, Italy – gold medal, 1st prize
- 2000 - Grado, Italy – two gold medals
- 2002 - Tolosa, Spain – 1st prize
- 2003 - Wales, England - third prize in vocal groups competition
- 2004 - Bremen, Germany ("Choir Olympics") - two gold medals
- 2006 - Xiamen, China ("Choir Olympics") – gold medal and a 1st prize
- 2008 - Graz, Austria ("Choir Olympics") – gold medal and the "World Champions" title
- 2009 - Bratislava, Slovakia – three gold medals
- 2011 - Wernigerode, Germany - three gold medals

== Discography ==
- Schindler's List - Original Motion Picture Soundtrack (1994)
- A Prayer for Peace - In Memory of Yitzhak Rabin (1996)
- The Choir’s Repertoire (1996)
- Smoke and Ashes (1998)
- Berale Come Out (2000)
- The Choir’s Repertoire (2002)
- The Little Prince (2003)
- Memorial Concert Commemorating the 60th Anniversary of the Holocaust of Hungarian Jewry (2005)
- Wind & Sand (2006)
- 2010 (2011)
- Children's Songs (2012)

== See also ==
- Music of Israel
