= Mulefoot =

American breed of pig

- Conservation status: Critically rare
- Country of origin: Spain

Traits

Mulefoot are a breed of domestic pig which is named for its intact, uncloven hooves reminiscent of a mule.

== Description ==
These pigs are typically black, on rare occasions having white markings. They have long snouts that slowly converge downward, have erect, floppy ears, and short, shiny hair. Their face is similar to that of a wild boar’s. They typically reach a weight of 400 to 600 pounds (180 to 270 kg), with males averaging 550 pounds (250 kg) and females 450 pounds (200 kg). The sows are known as good mothers, having litters that average 5 to 6 piglets.

== History ==
The Mulefoot likely originated with swine brought to the Gulf Coast by the Spanish; however, exactly when they originated as a syndactyl animal is not clear. While pigs with single hooves are found in writings as far back as Aristotle, the Mulefoot is the only population to be considered a breed, having an established standard type. The breed is possibly closely related to the Choctaw hog, and may share a similar ancestry. The Spanish-descended ungulates were minimally managed, with some selective breeding, which continued into the late 1800s. Breed standards for the Mulefoot arose around 1900. The breed was seen mainly in the Corn Belt and Mississippi River Valley. The early 20th century saw the breed at the peak of its popularity, with over 200 purebred herds and two breed associations. At the same time, some Mulefoots were exported to Canada, but the population was not maintained.

In the mid-20th century, the population began to decline, and by 1964, one breeder, R. M. Holiday of Louisiana, Missouri, established what would become the last herd of purebred Mulefoot hogs. He acquired swine from all known purebred breeders, and used selective breeding to maintain the breed standard. By 1976, the registries for the breed closed, and the herd books, pedigrees and other registration information were lost. In 1993, Mark Fields and the American Livestock Breeds Conservancy (later The Livestock Conservancy) began working with Holiday to re-establish the breed registry and expand breeding programs to additional farms.

As of 2013, The Livestock Conservancy considers the Mulefoot to be critically endangered, a categorization given to breeds with a population of fewer than 2,000 and yearly registrations of fewer than 200. As of 2006, there were estimated to be fewer than 200 purebred Mulefoot hogs in existence.

Maveric Ranch took over conservatorship of the Mulefoot Breed in 2006. To date, they have placed breeding groups on over 40 farms across the USA.
