= Choctaw Hog =

American breed of pig

- Conservation status: Critically rare breed
- Country of origin: United States

Traits

The Choctaw Hog is a breed of domestic pig historically used by Native Americans. They are now reduced in population to some hundred animals, most of them in the Choctaw Nation of Oklahoma. The American Livestock Breeds Conservancy calls the Choctaw Hog's status "critically rare" and says it "is a high conservation priority."

== History ==
The Choctaw Hog descends from livestock brought to the Americas by Spaniards from the 16th century onwards. The Choctaw Hog was used not only by Native Americans but also by European settlers and a succession of other peoples in the Southeastern United States for over three hundred years.

The Choctaw people and their livestock were forcibly removed from the Deep South to Oklahoma Territory in the early 19th century. The United States government forced the Five Civilized Tribes out of Mississippi and Alabama in 1830, and they too brought more hogs to Oklahoma. An Oklahoma Choctaw will from 1858 leaves the posthumous "wish and desire that all the hogs running at the home place be gathered and sold". It is from Oklahoma swine that today's Choctaw Hogs are descended and their appearance has changed little in 150 years.

== Description ==
Choctaw hogs have two distinctive characteristics indicative of their ancestors brought from Spain. First, their toes are typically fused forming a single hoof like that of a mule. The mulefoot shares this trait for the same reason and the two breeds may come from common ancestral stock which was loosely selected and managed until the late 19th century. Secondly, many have fleshy wattles on each side of their necks.

These hogs are black, sometimes with white markings, and at about 120 pounds, they are relatively small for a domestic pig. Feral descendants of Spanish pigs are much more common than non-feral ones, but the Choctaw is "a pure Spanish breed" and is distinct from the exact feral hog populations in the Choctaw National Wildlife Refuge area, which are of mixed ancestry. They are nevertheless quick and athletic pigs with heavy forequarters and "it is obvious that Choctaw hogs are built for survival".

== Cultivation ==
The Choctaw tribe still raises these hogs in Oklahoma. They require relatively little care and are traditionally allowed to run free on open range and forage for acorns, berries, invertebrates, roots, and whatever else they can find. With the aid of trained dogs, hogs are rounded up periodically, earmarked, and sorted. The dog usually used for this purpose is the Catahoula Leopard dog, another animal of probable Spanish origin. While Choctaw Hogs kept in confinement can become very tame, some may be "amazed at the speed and agility of Choctaw hogs."

Pigs kept for market are fattened with corn to improve their value. A paper from the Virginia-Maryland Regional College of Veterinary Medicine describes the Choctaw as "large and fat" and reports:

As hog breeding more favors the industrial organization and breeding of white hogs for lean pork production these remnants of the Spanish strains that were adapted for extensive systems are becoming rarer and rarer.

The American Livestock Breeds Conservancy reports that Choctaws do not have a very valuable "market carcass". Lacking economic incentive, commercial interests are not drawn to help in the Choctaw's conservation and there is no official Choctaw Hog registry for this breed.
