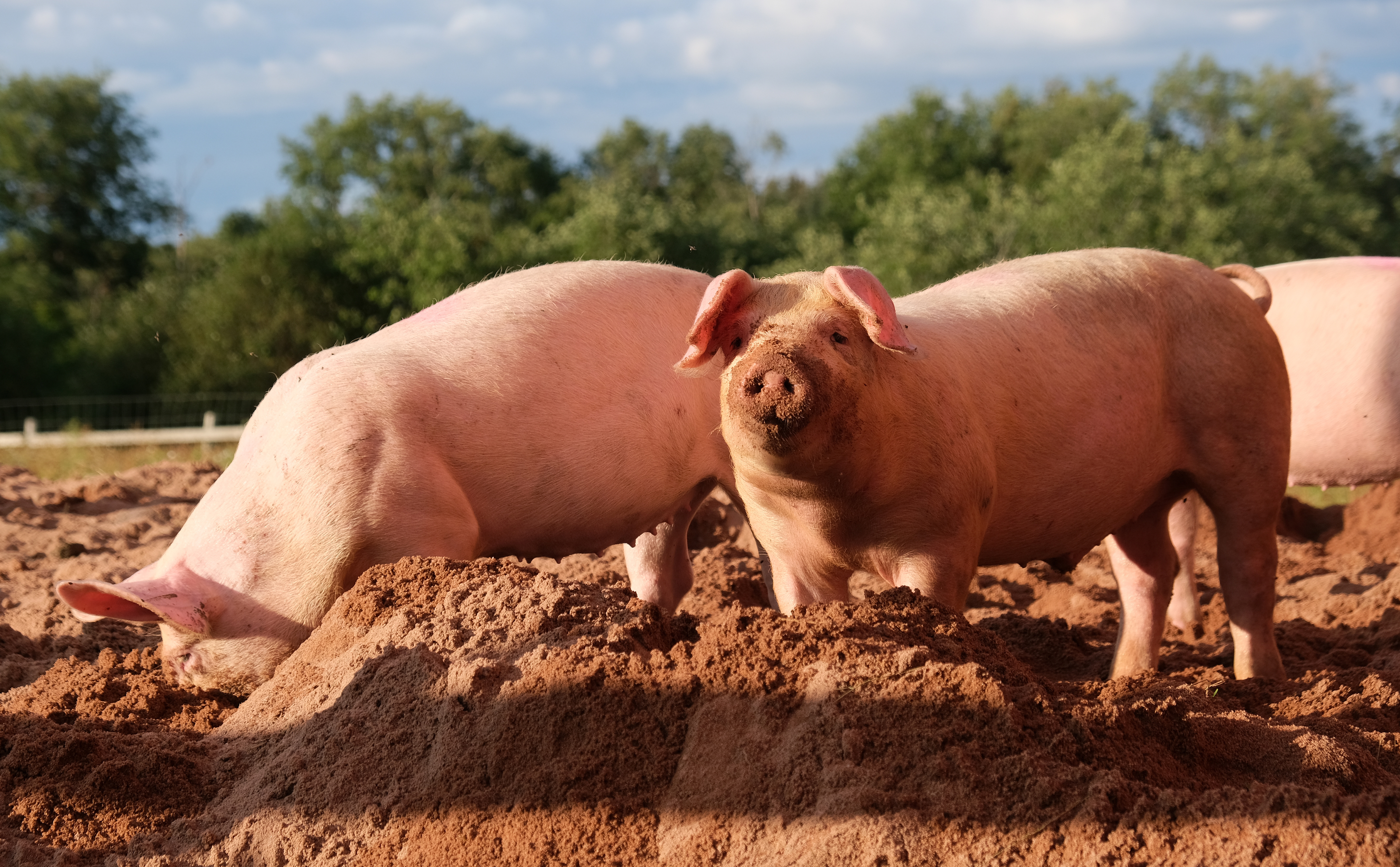
- Domestic pigs

Conservation status
- Domesticated

Scientific classification
- Kingdom: Animalia
- Phylum: Chordata
- Class: Mammalia
- Order: Artiodactyla
- Family: Suidae
- Genus: Sus
- Species: S. domesticus

Binomial name
- Sus domesticus Erxleben, 1777

Synonyms
- Sus domestica; Sus scrofa domesticus Linnaeus, 1758

Audio
- Call

= Pig =

Domesticated omnivorous even-toed ungulate

The pig (Sus domesticus), also called swine (pl.: swine) or hog, is an omnivorous, domesticated, even-toed, hoofed mammal. It is named the domestic pig when distinguishing it from other members of the genus Sus. Some authorities consider it a subspecies of Sus scrofa (the wild boar or Eurasian boar); other authorities consider it a distinct species. Pigs were domesticated independently twice during the Neolithic, in the Near East around the Tigris Basin, and in China. When domesticated pigs arrived in Europe from the Near East, they extensively interbred with wild boar in Europe but retained their domesticated features.

Pigs are farmed primarily for their meat, which is called pork. The animal's skin or hide is used for leather. China is the world's largest pork producer, followed by the European Union and then the United States. Around 1.5 billion pigs are raised each year, producing some 120 million tonnes of meat, often cured as bacon. Some are kept as pets.

Pigs have featured in human culture since Neolithic times, appearing in art and literature for children and adults, and celebrated in cities such as Bologna for their meat products.

== Description ==
The pig has a large head, with a long snout strengthened by a special prenasal bone and a disk of cartilage at the tip. The snout is used to dig into the soil to find food and is an acute sense organ. The dental formula of adult pigs is 3.1.4.33.1.4.3, giving a total of 44 teeth. The rear teeth are adapted for crushing. In males, the canine teeth can form tusks, which grow continuously and are sharpened by grinding against each other. There are four hoofed toes on each foot; the two larger central toes bear most of the weight, while the outer two are also used in soft ground. Most pigs have rather sparsely bristled hair on their skin, though there are some woolly-coated breeds such as the Mangalitsa. Adult pigs generally weigh between 140 and 300 kg (310 and 660 lb), though some breeds can exceed this range. Exceptionally, a pig called Big Bill weighed 1,157 kg (2,551 lb) and had a shoulder height of 1.5 m (4 ft 11 in).

Pigs possess both apocrine and eccrine sweat glands, although the latter are limited to the snout. Pigs, like other "hairless" mammals such as elephants, do not use thermal sweat glands in cooling. Pigs are less able than many other mammals to dissipate heat from wet mucous membranes in the mouth by panting. Their thermoneutral zone is 16–22 °C (61–72 °F). At higher temperatures, pigs lose heat by wallowing in mud or water via evaporative cooling, although it has been suggested that wallowing may serve other functions, such as protection from sunburn, ecto-parasite control, and scent-marking. Pigs are among four mammalian species with mutations in the nicotinic acetylcholine receptor that protect against snake venom. Mongooses, honey badgers, hedgehogs, and pigs all have different modifications to the receptor pocket which prevents α-neurotoxin from binding. Pigs have small lungs for their body size, and are thus more susceptible than other domesticated animals to fatal bronchitis and pneumonia. The genome of the pig has been sequenced; it contains about 20,000 to over 22,000 protein-coding genes.

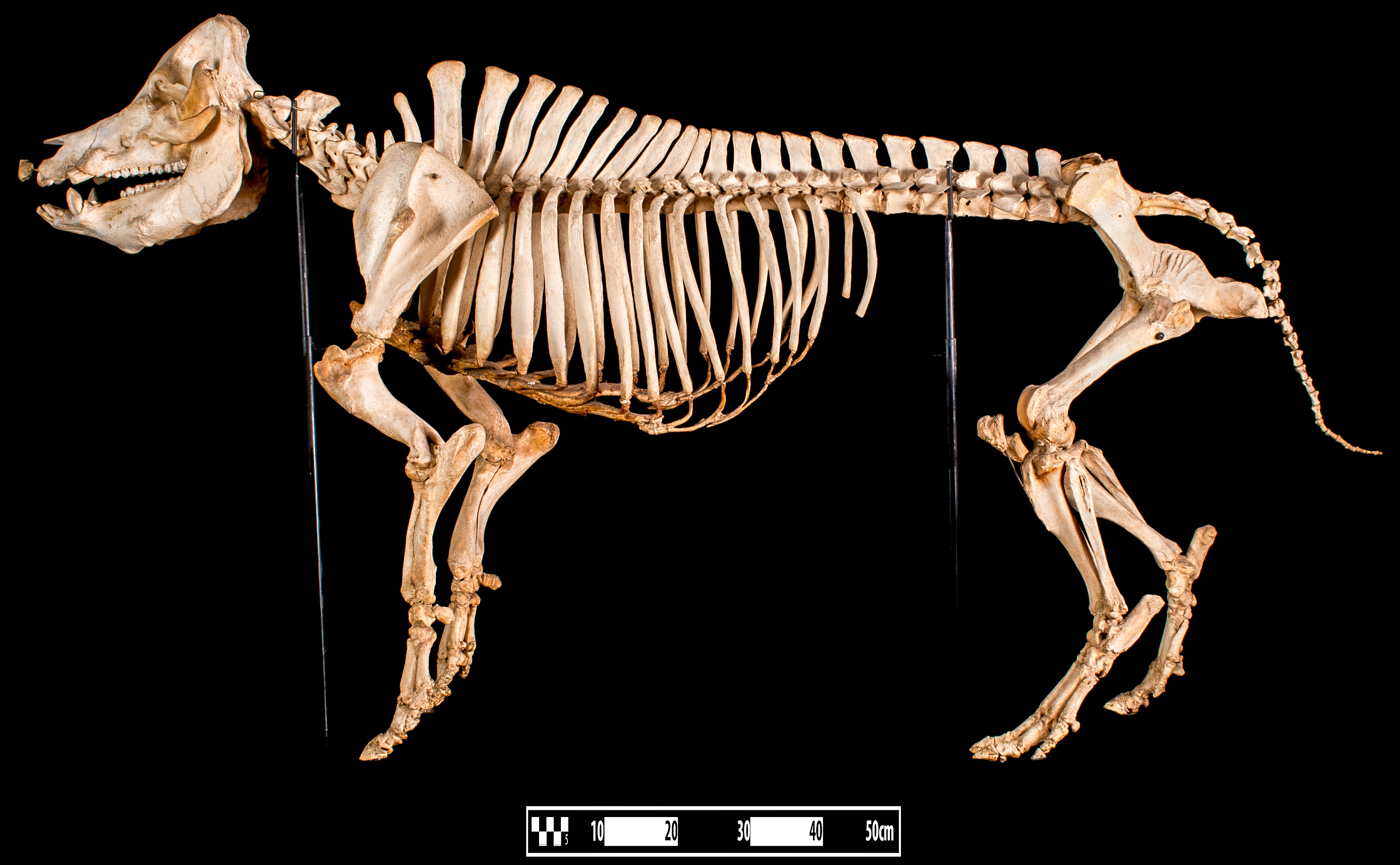
Skeleton

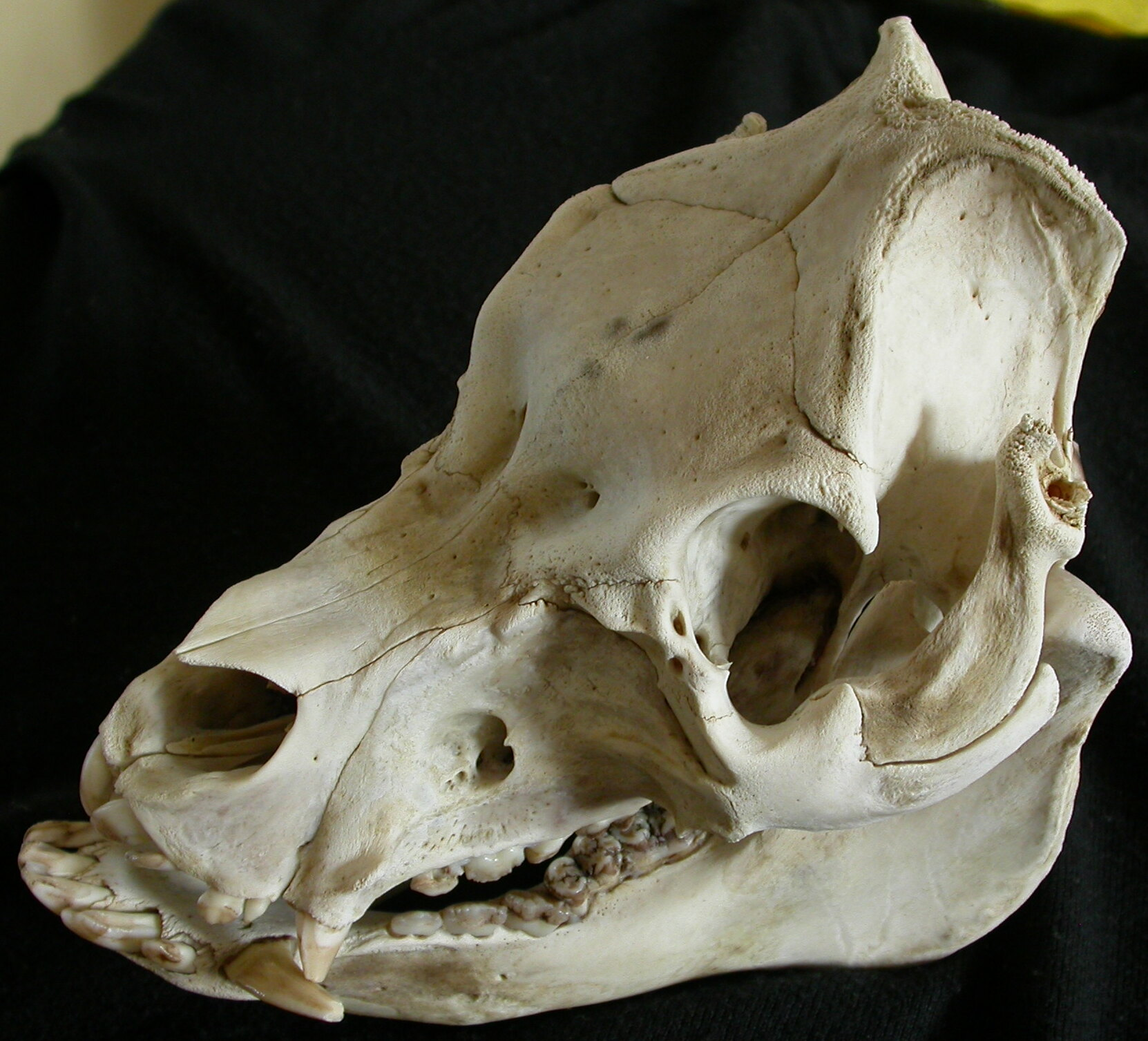
Skull

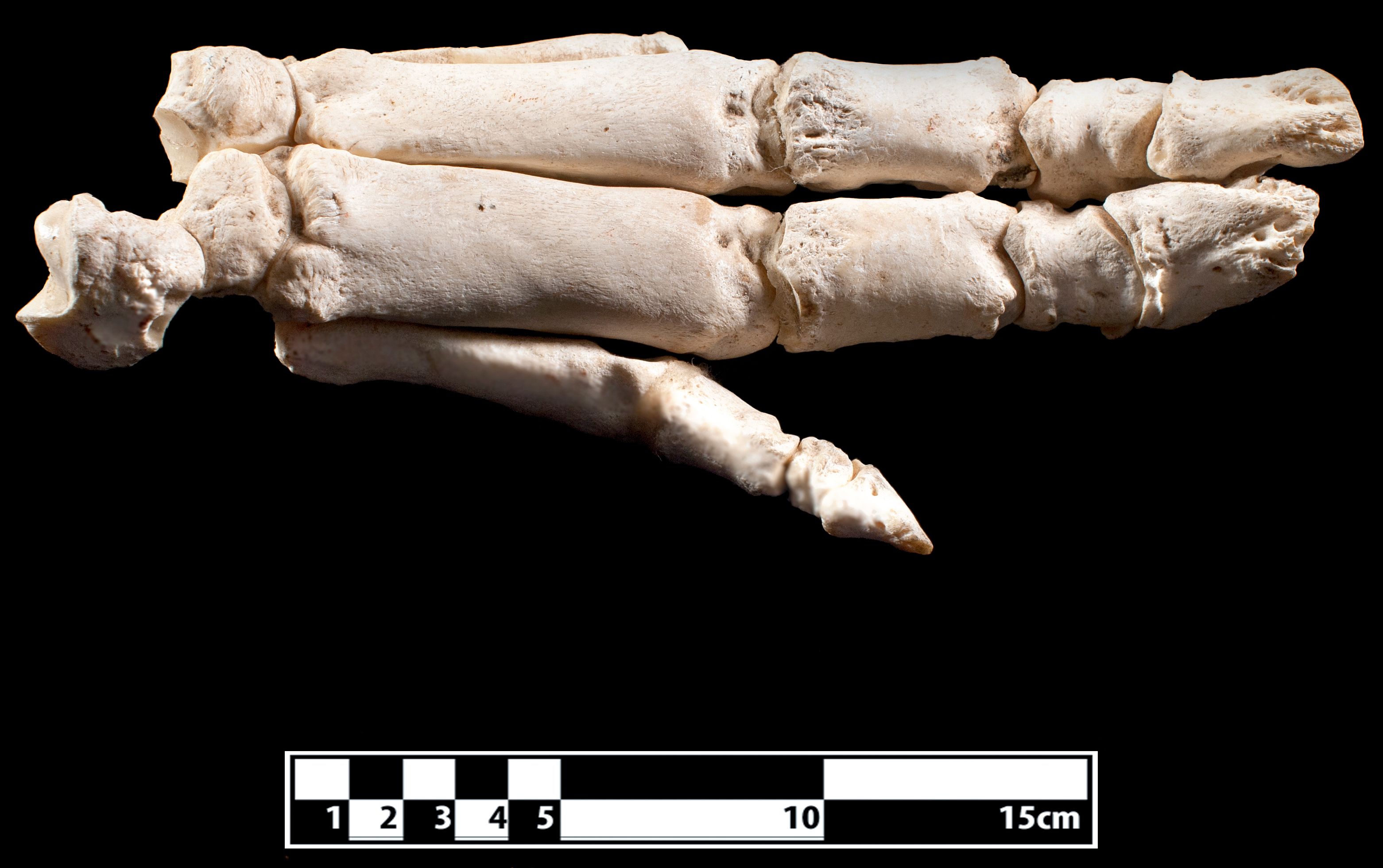
Bones of the foot

== Evolution ==
=== Phylogeny ===
Domestic pigs are related to other pig species as shown in the cladogram, based on phylogenetic analysis using mitochondrial DNA.

- Suidae
  - Indonesia
    Babirusa
  - - Africa
      - Red river hog
      - Warthogs
    - Southeast Asia
      - Visayan warty pig
      - - Philippine warty pig
        - - - Bornean bearded pig
            - Javan warty pig
          - Eurasia
            - Wild boar
            - Domestic pig
              - East Asian pigs
              - European pigs

=== Taxonomy ===
The pig is most often considered to be a subspecies of the wild boar, which was given the name Sus scrofa by Carl Linnaeus in 1758; following from this, the formal name of the pig is Sus scrofa domesticus. However, in 1777, Johann Christian Polycarp Erxleben classified the pig as a separate species from the wild boar. He gave it the name Sus domesticus, still used by some taxonomists. The American Society of Mammalogists considers it a separate species.

== History ==
=== Domestication in the Neolithic ===
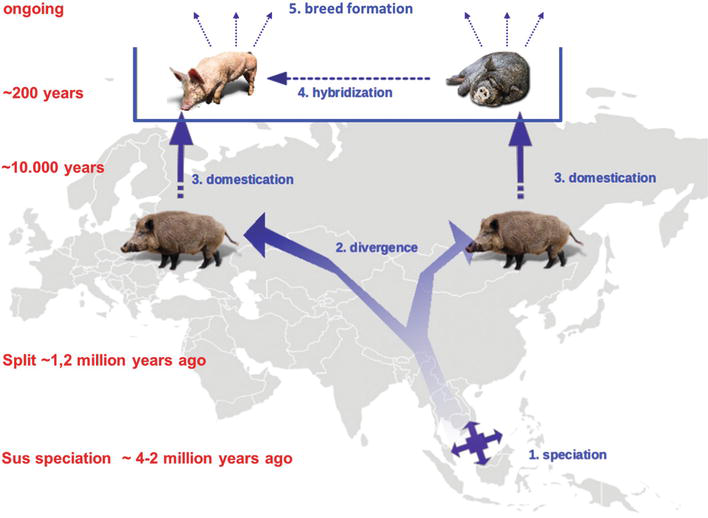
The initial emergence of wild pigs, followed by the genetic divergence between boars and pigs and the domestication of pigs

Archaeological evidence shows that pigs were domesticated from wild boar in the Near East in or around the Tigris Basin, being managed in a semi-wild state much as they are managed by some modern New Guineans. There were pigs in Cyprus more than 11,400 years ago, introduced from the mainland, implying domestication in the adjacent mainland by then. Pigs were separately domesticated in China, starting some 8,000 years ago. In the Near East, pig husbandry spread for the next few millennia. It reduced gradually during the Bronze Age, as rural populations instead focused on commodity-producing livestock, but it was sustained in cities.

Domestication did not involve reproductive isolation with population bottlenecks. Western Asian pigs were introduced into Europe, where they crossed with wild boar. There appears to have been interbreeding with a now extinct ghost population of wild pigs during the Pleistocene. The genomes of domestic pigs show strong selection for genes affecting behavior and morphology. Human selection for domestic traits likely counteracted the homogenizing effect of gene flow from wild boars and created domestication islands in the genome. Pigs arrived in Europe from the Near East at least 8,500 years ago. Over the next 3,000 years they interbred with European wild boar until their genome showed less than 5% Near Eastern ancestry, yet retained their domesticated features.

DNA evidence from subfossil remains of teeth and jawbones of Neolithic pigs shows that the first domestic pigs in Europe were brought from the Near East. This stimulated the domestication of local European wild boar, resulting in a third domestication event with the Near Eastern genes dying out in European pig stock. More recently there have been complex exchanges, with European domesticated lines being exported, in turn, to the ancient Near East. Historical records indicate that Asian pig breeds were reintroduced to Europe during the 18th and early 19th centuries.

Domesticated pigs were among the three main domesticated animals (with chickens and dogs) carried by the seaborne Neolithic migrations of the Austronesian peoples to Island Southeast Asia and Oceania, around 4000 years ago. Most free-living and domesticated pigs from the Philippines to Hawaiʻi are descended from domesticated pigs (Sus scrofa) introduced by Austronesians from southeastern China and Taiwan via the Philippines. Other species of pigs (Sus celebensis, Sus barbatus, Sus cebifrons, and Sus verrucosus), also spread much earlier from Mainland Southeast Asia to Island Southeast Asia west of the Wallace Line, via natural means or earlier (non-Austronesian) hunter-gatherer groups. Many of these endemic pigs later hybridized with the S. scrofa carried by Austronesians. Early archaeological specimens of pigs in Near and Remote Oceania exhibit no genetic admixture with local wild populations, maintaining a distinct, introduced mitochondrial lineage (the "Pacific Clade") that remained genetically isolated during the initial settlement period. There is evidence that humans have moved pigs around the Asia-Pacific for at least 50,000 years.

=== In the Americas ===
==== Columbian Exchange ====
Among the animals that the Spanish introduced to the Chiloé Archipelago in the 16th century Columbian Exchange, pigs were the most successful in adapting to local conditions. The pigs benefited from abundant shellfish and algae exposed by the large tides of the archipelago. Pigs were brought to southeastern North America from Europe by de Soto and other early Spanish explorers. Escaped pigs became feral.

==== Feral pigs ====
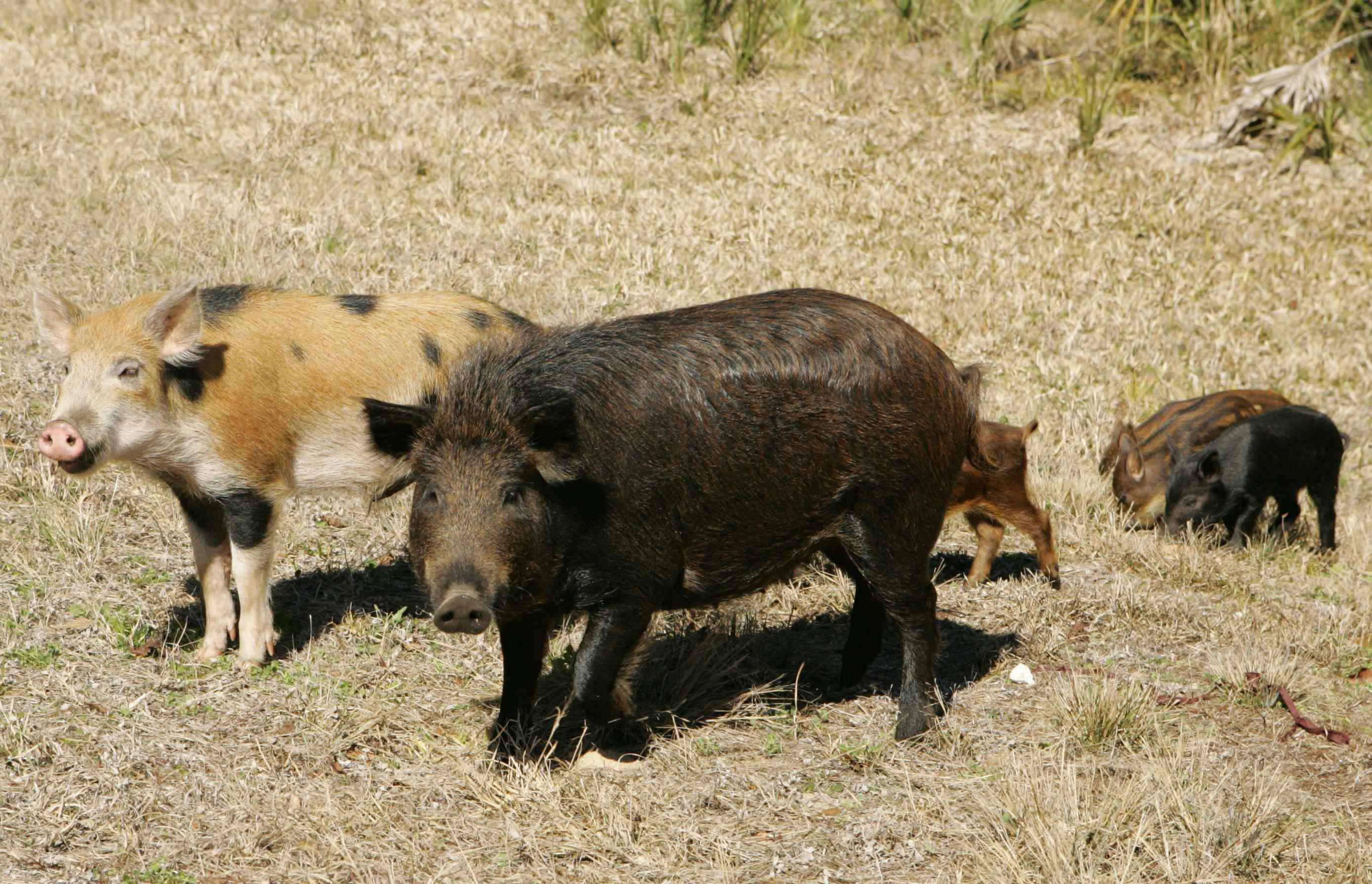
A family of feral pigs

Pigs have escaped from farms and gone feral in many parts of the world. Feral pigs in the southeastern United States have migrated north to the Midwest, where many state agencies have programs to remove them. Feral pigs in New Zealand and northern Queensland have caused substantial environmental damage. Feral hybrids of the European wild boar with the domestic pig are disruptive to both environment and agriculture, as they destroy crops, spread animal diseases including foot-and-mouth disease, and consume wildlife such as juvenile seabirds and young tortoises. Feral pig damage is especially an issue in southeastern South America.

== Reproduction ==
=== Physiology ===
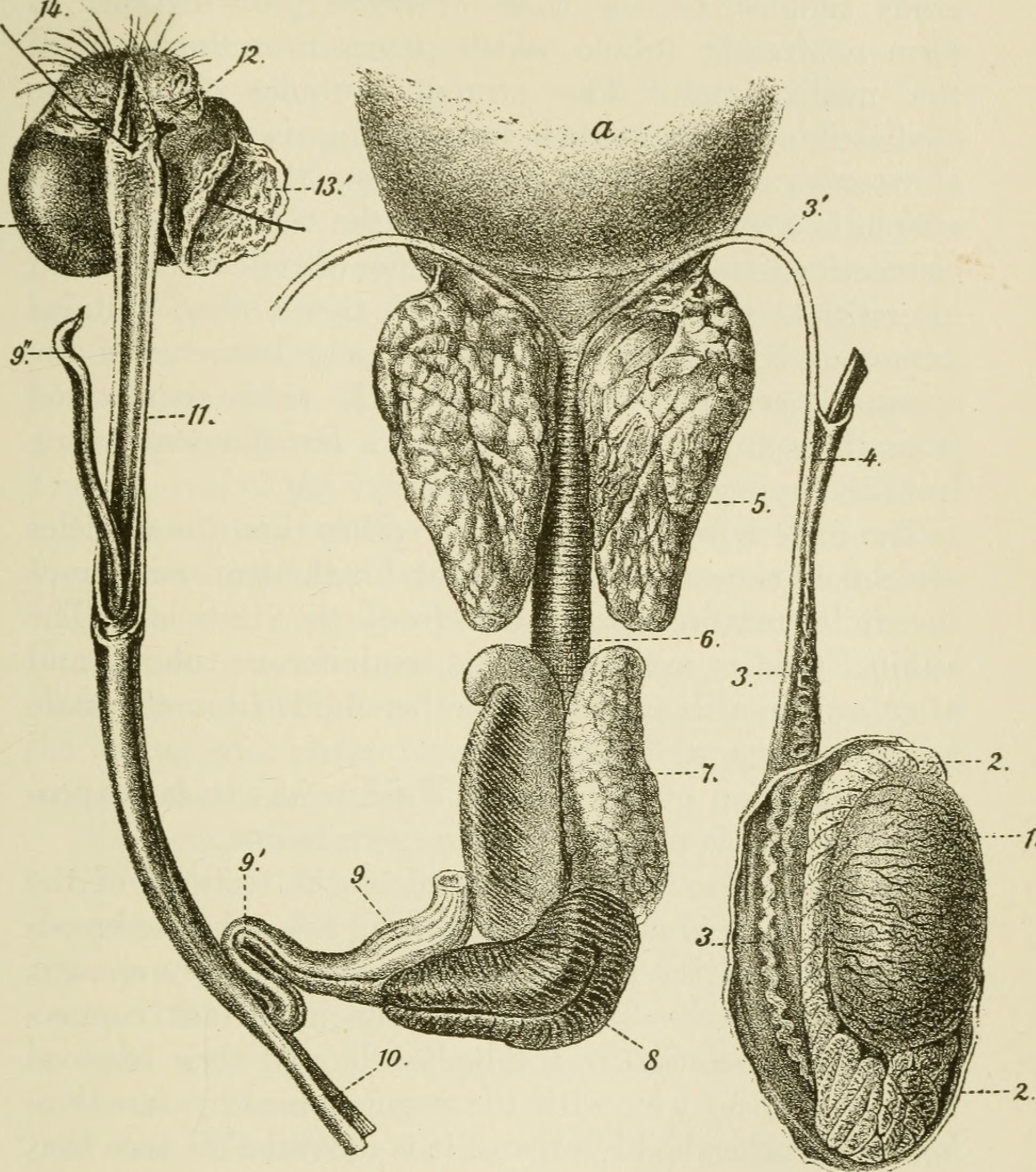
Reproductive system of the boar

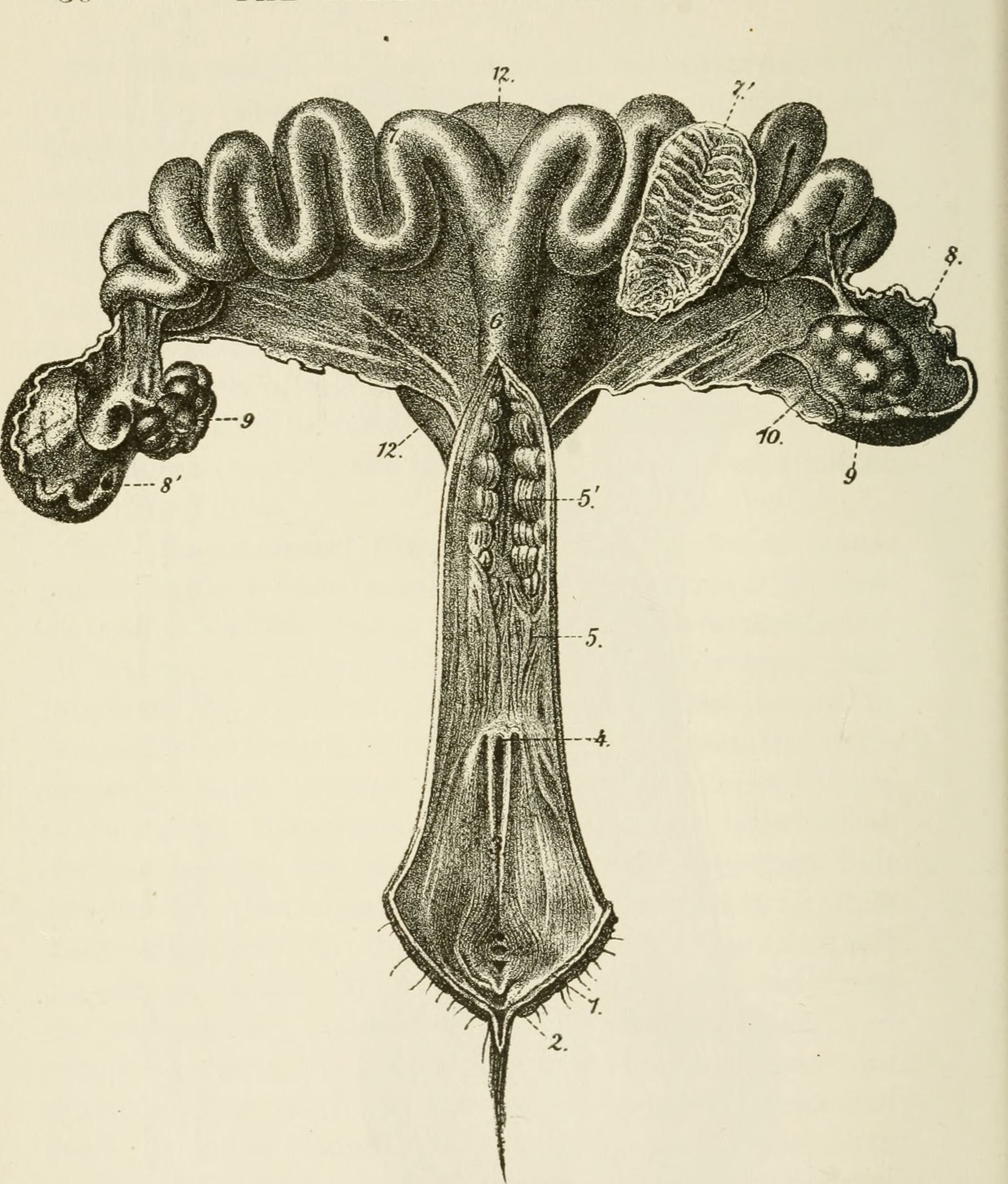
Reproductive system of the sow

Female pigs reach sexual maturity at 3–12 months of age and come into estrus every 18–24 days if they are not successfully bred. The variation in ovulation rate can be attributed to intrinsic factors such as age and genotype, as well as extrinsic factors like nutrition, environment, and the supplementation of exogenous hormones. The gestation period averages 112–120 days.

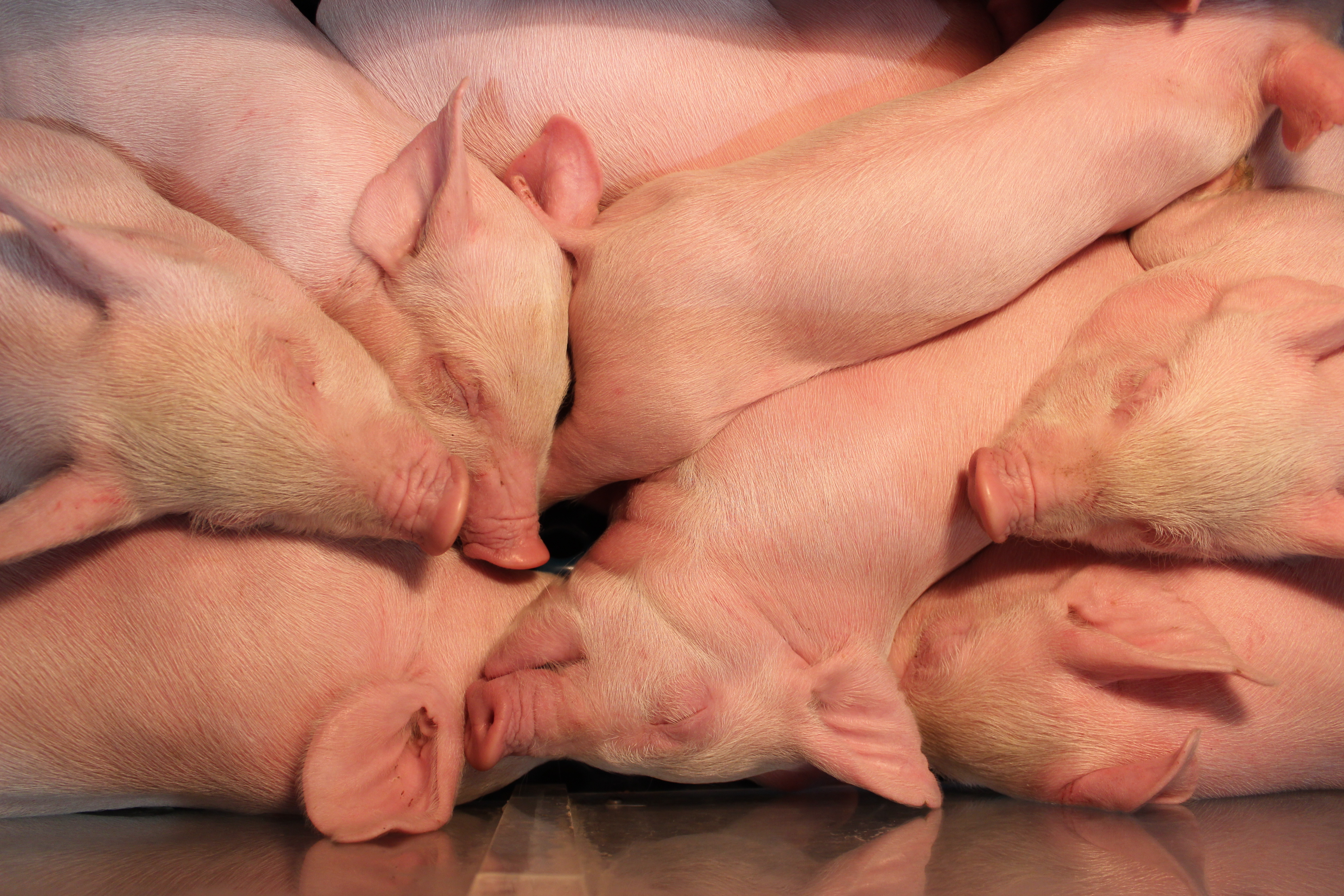
Piglets keeping warm together

Estrus lasts two to three days, and the female's displayed receptiveness to mate is known as standing heat. Standing heat is a reflexive response that is stimulated when the female is in contact with the saliva of a sexually mature boar. Androstenol is one of the pheromones produced in the submaxillary salivary glands of boars that trigger the female's response. The female cervix contains a series of five interdigitating pads, or folds, that hold the boar's corkscrew-shaped penis during copulation. Females have bicornuate uteruses and two conceptuses must be present in both uterine horns to enable pregnancy to proceed. The mother's body recognises that it is pregnant on days 11 to 12 of pregnancy, and is marked by the corpus luteum's producing the sex hormone progesterone. To sustain the pregnancy, the embryo signals to the corpus luteum with the hormones estradiol and prostaglandin E2. This signaling acts on both the endometrium and luteal tissue to prevent the regression of the corpus luteum by activation of genes that are responsible for corpus luteum maintenance. During mid to late pregnancy, the corpus luteum relies primarily on luteinizing hormone for maintenance until birth.

Archeological evidence indicates that medieval European pigs farrowed, or bore a litter of piglets, once per year. By the nineteenth century, European piglets routinely double-farrowed, or bore two litters of piglets per year. It is unclear when this shift occurred. Pigs have a maximum life span of about 27 years.

=== Nest-building ===
A characteristic of pigs which they share with carnivores is nest-building. Sows root in the ground to create depressions the size of their body, and then build nest mounds, using twigs and leaves, softer in the middle, in which to give birth. When the mound reaches the desired height, she places large branches, up to 2 metres in length, on the surface. She enters the mound and roots around to create a depression within the gathered material. She then gives birth in a lying position, unlike other artiodactyls which usually stand while birthing.

Nest-building occurs during the last 24 hours before the onset of farrowing, and becomes most intense 12 to 6 hours before farrowing. The sow separates from the group and seeks a suitable nest site with well-drained soil and shelter from rain and wind. This provides the offspring with shelter, comfort, and thermoregulation. The nest provides protection against weather and predators, while keeping the piglets close to the sow and away from the rest of the herd. This ensures they do not get trampled on, and prevents other piglets from stealing milk from the sow. The onset of nest-building is triggered by a rise in prolactin level, caused by a decrease in progesterone and an increase in prostaglandin; the gathering of nest material seems to be regulated more by external stimuli such as temperature.

=== Nursing and suckling ===
Pigs have complex nursing and suckling behaviour. Nursing occurs every 50–60 minutes, and the sow requires stimulation from piglets before milk let-down. Sensory inputs (vocalisation, odours from mammary and birth fluids, and hair patterns of the sow) are particularly important immediately post-birth to facilitate teat location by the piglets. Initially, the piglets compete for position at the udder; then the piglets massage around their respective teats with their snouts, during which time the sow grunts at slow, regular intervals. Each series of grunts varies in frequency, tone and magnitude, indicating the stages of nursing to the piglets.

The phase of competition for teats and of nosing the udder lasts for about a minute, ending when milk begins to flow. The piglets then hold the teats in their mouths and suck with slow mouth movements (one per second), and the rate of the sow's grunting increases for approximately 20 seconds. The grunt peak in the third phase of suckling does not coincide with milk ejection, but rather the release of oxytocin from the pituitary into the bloodstream. Phase four coincides with the period of main milk flow (10–20 seconds) when the piglets suddenly withdraw slightly from the udder and start sucking with rapid mouth movements of about three per second. The sow grunts rapidly, lower in tone and often in quick runs of three or four, during this phase. Finally, the flow stops and so does the grunting of the sow. The piglets may dart from teat to teat and recommence suckling with slow movements, or nosing the udder. Piglets massage and suckle the sow's teats after milk flow ceases as a way of letting the sow know their nutritional status. This helps her to regulate the amount of milk released from that teat in future sucklings. The more intense the post-feed massaging of a teat, the more milk that teat later releases.

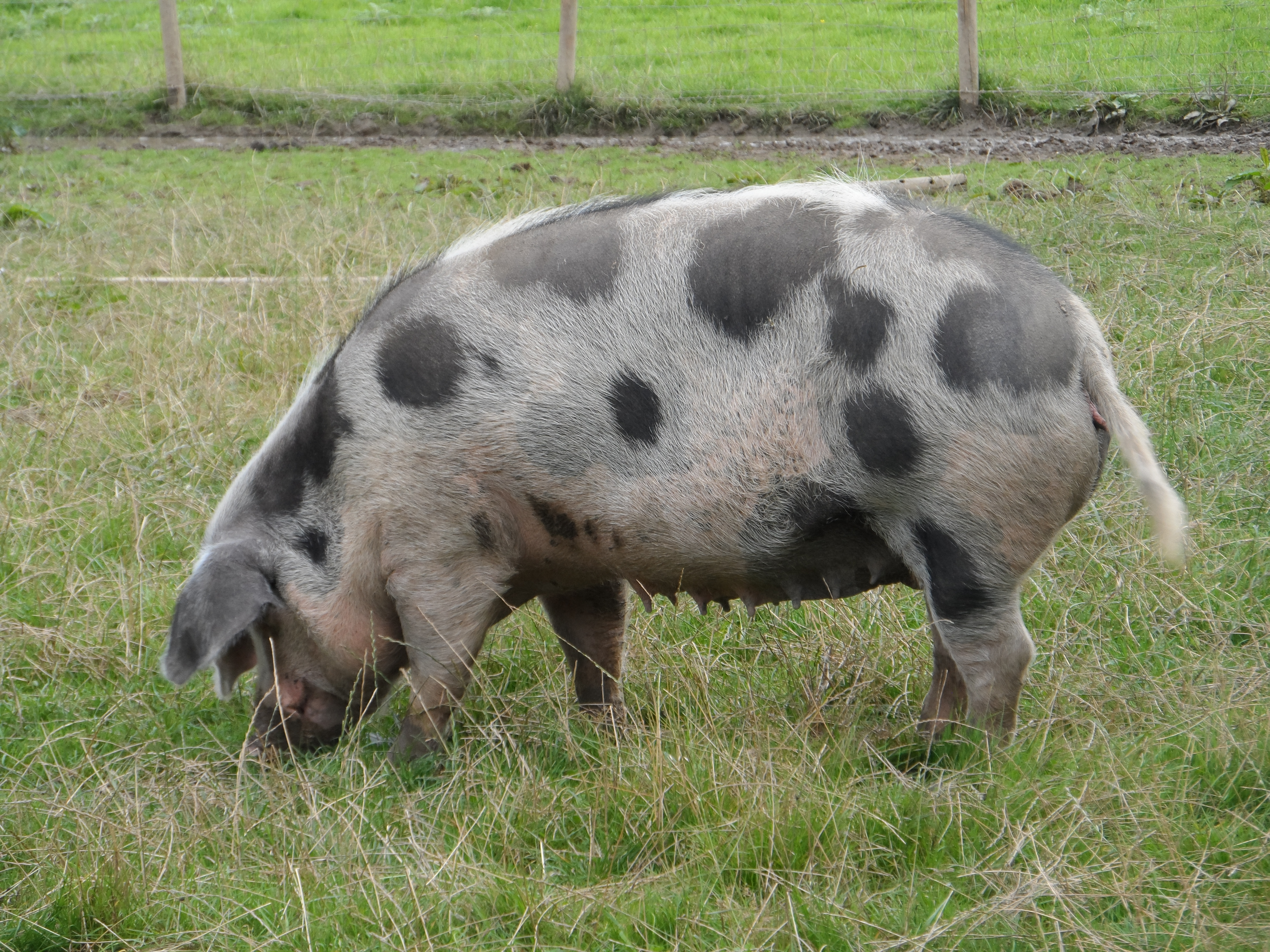
Sows typically have 12–14 nipples.

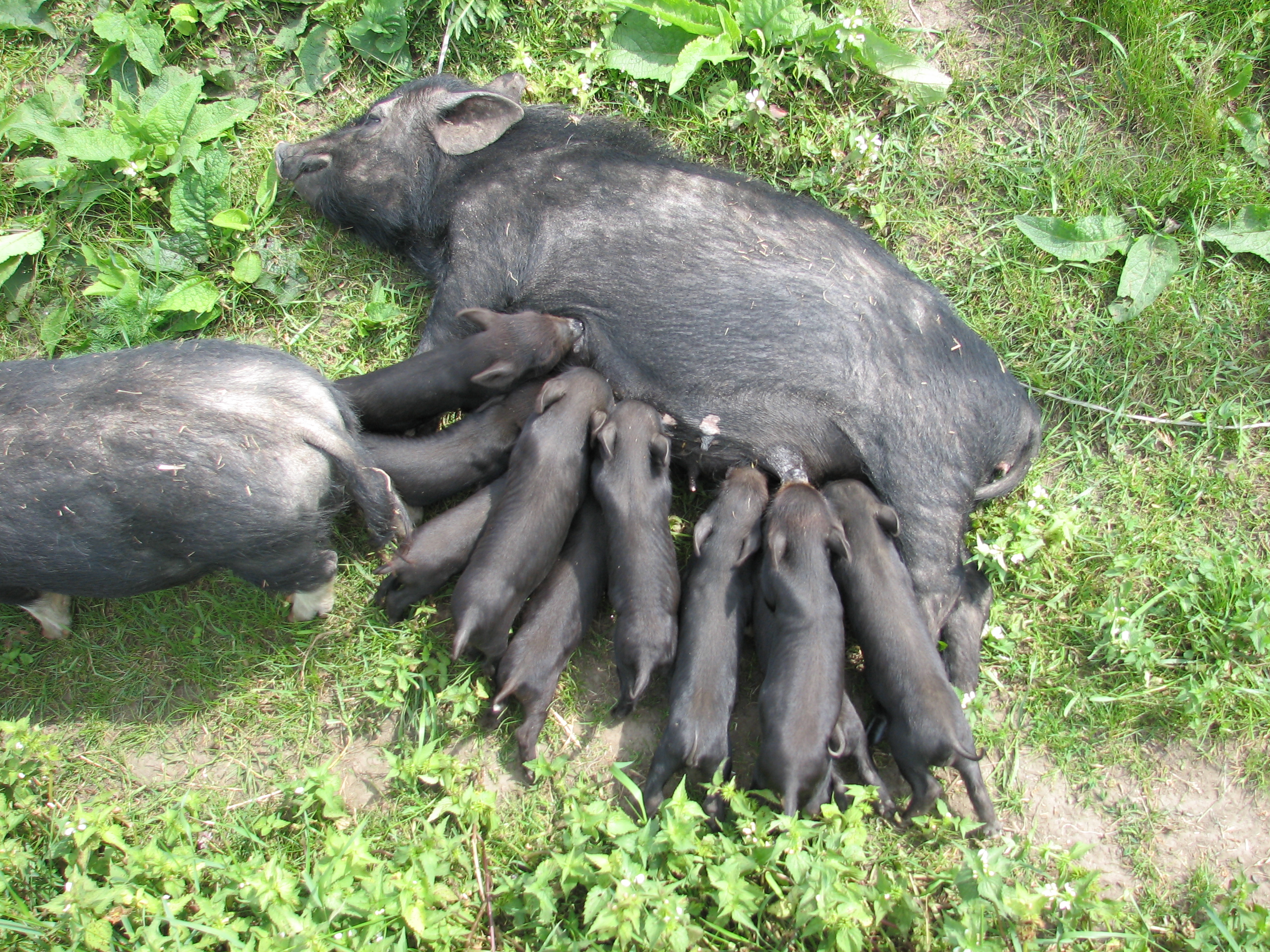
A sow with suckling piglets

=== Teat order ===
In pigs, dominance hierarchies are formed at an early age. Piglets are precocious, and attempt to suckle soon after being born. The piglets are born with sharp teeth and fight for the anterior teats, as these produce more milk. Once established, this teat order remains stable; each piglet tends to feed on a particular teat or group of teats. Stimulation of the anterior teats appears to be important in causing milk letdown, so it might be advantageous to the entire litter to have these teats occupied by healthy piglets. Piglets locate teats by sight and then by olfaction.

== Behaviour ==
=== Social ===
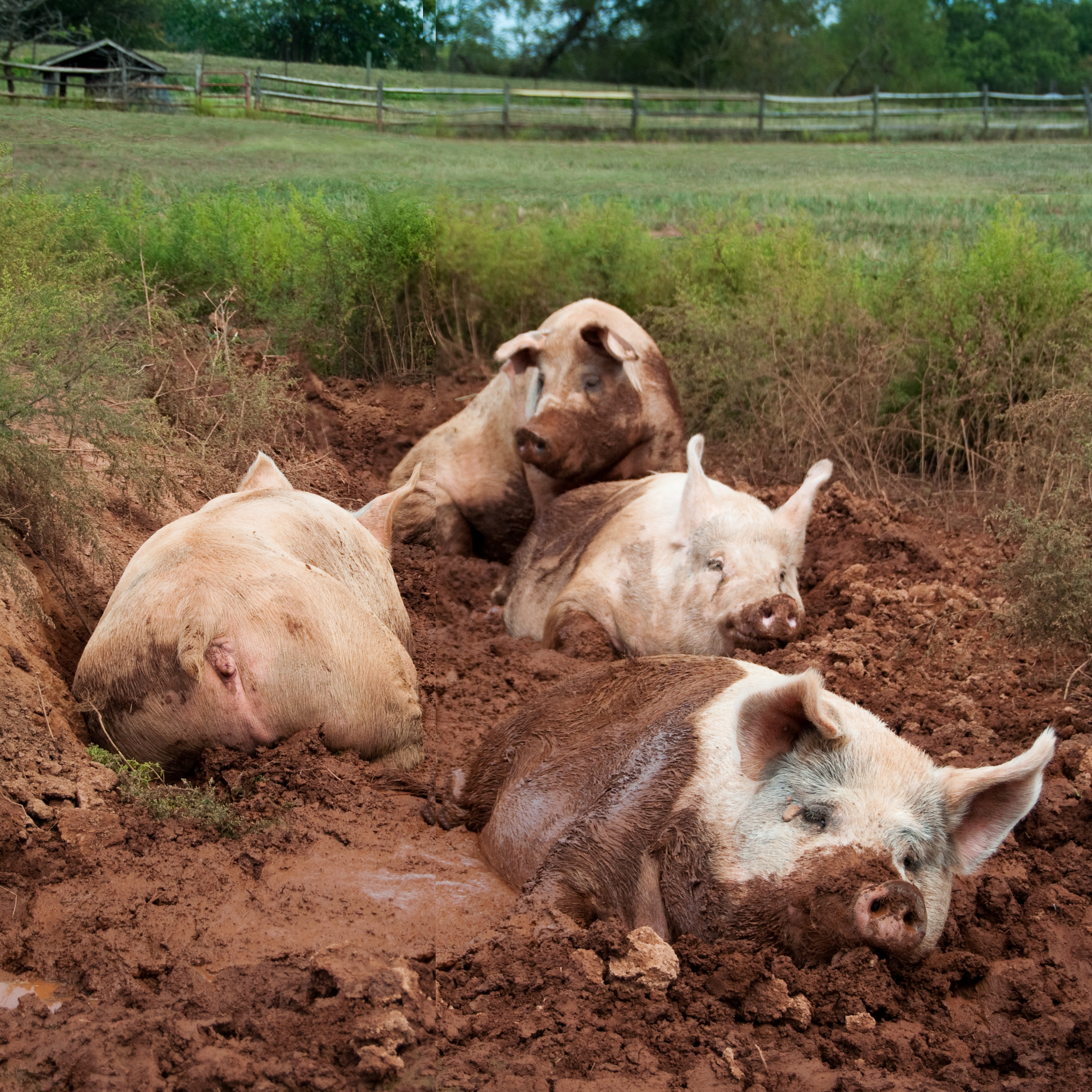
American Yorkshire pigs in a wallow

Pig behaviour is intermediate between that of other artiodactyls and of carnivores. Pigs seek out the company of other pigs and often huddle to maintain physical contact, but they do not naturally form large herds. They live in groups of about 8–10 adult sows, some young individuals, and some single males. Pigs confined in a simplified, crowded, or uncomfortable environment may resort to tail-biting; farmers sometimes dock the tails of pigs to prevent the problem, or may enrich the environment with toys or other objects to reduce the risk.

=== Temperature control ===
Because of their relative lack of sweat glands, pigs often control their body temperature using behavioural thermoregulation. Wallowing, coating the body with mud, is a common behaviour. They do not submerge completely under the mud, but vary the depth and duration of wallowing depending on environmental conditions. Adult pigs start wallowing once the ambient temperature is around 17–21 °C (63–70 °F). They cover themselves in mud from head to tail. They may use mud as a sunscreen, or to keep parasites away. Most bristled pigs "blow their coat", meaning that they shed most of the longer, coarser stiff hair once a year, usually in spring or early summer, to prepare for the warmer months ahead.

=== Eating, feeding, sleeping ===
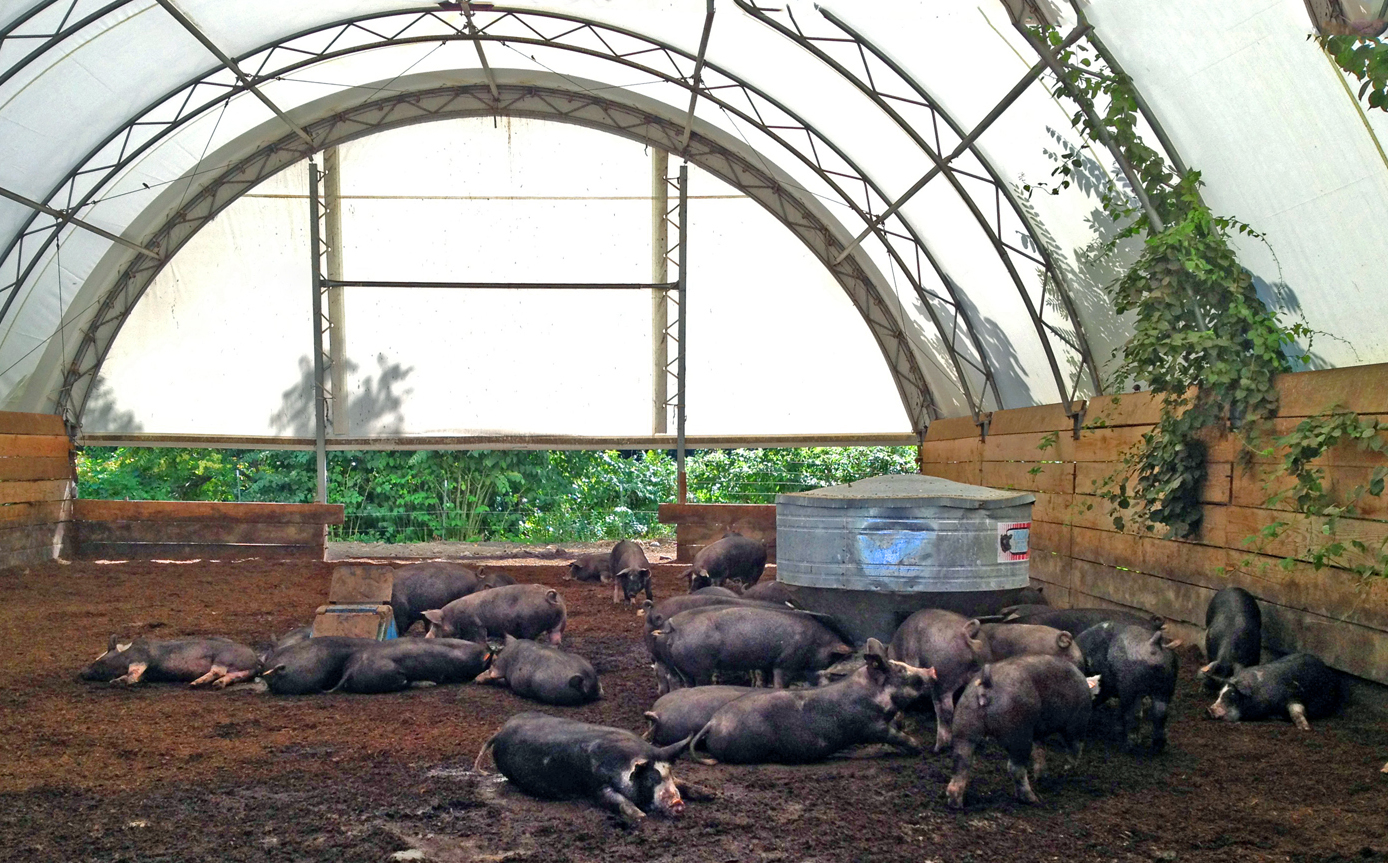
Pigs around a rotary feeder

Where pigs are allowed to roam freely, they walk roughly 4 km (2.5 mi) daily, scavenging within a home range of around 1 hectare (2.5 acres). Farmers in Africa often choose such a low-input, free-range production system.

If conditions permit, pigs feed continuously for many hours and then sleep for many hours, in contrast to ruminants, which tend to feed for a short time and then sleep for a short time. Pigs are omnivorous and versatile in their feeding behaviour. They primarily eat leaves, stems, roots, fruits, and flowers.

Rooting is an instinctual comforting behaviour in pigs characterized by nudging the snout into something. It first happens when piglets are born to obtain their mother's milk, and can become a habitual, obsessive behaviour, most prominent in animals weaned too early. Pigs root and dig into the ground to forage for food. Rooting is also a means of communication.

=== Intelligence ===
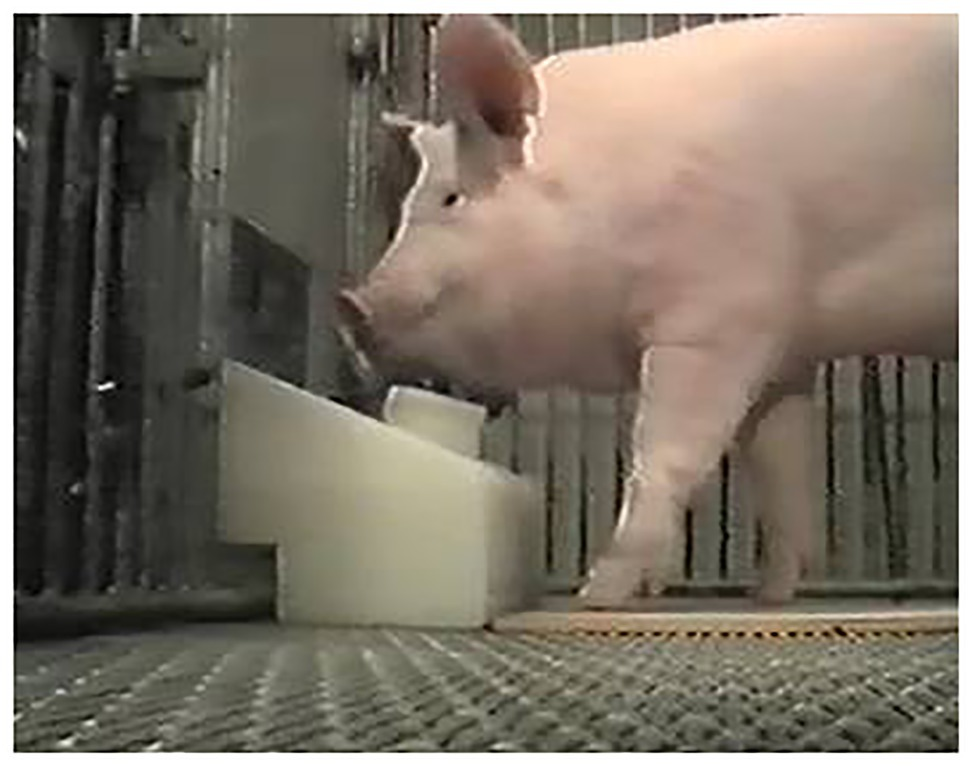
A pig using a specifically designed joystick

Pigs are relatively intelligent animals, roughly on par with dogs. They distinguish each other as individuals, spend time in play, and form structured communities. They have good long-term memory and they experience emotions, changing their behaviour in response to the emotional states of other pigs. In terms of experimental tasks, pigs can perform tasks that require them to identify the locations of objects; they can solve mazes; and they can work with a simple language of symbols. They display self-recognition in a mirror. Pigs have been trained to associate different sorts of music (Bach and a military march) with food and social isolation respectively, and could communicate the resulting positive or negative emotion to untrained pigs. Pigs can be trained to use a joystick with their snout to select a target on screen.

=== Senses ===
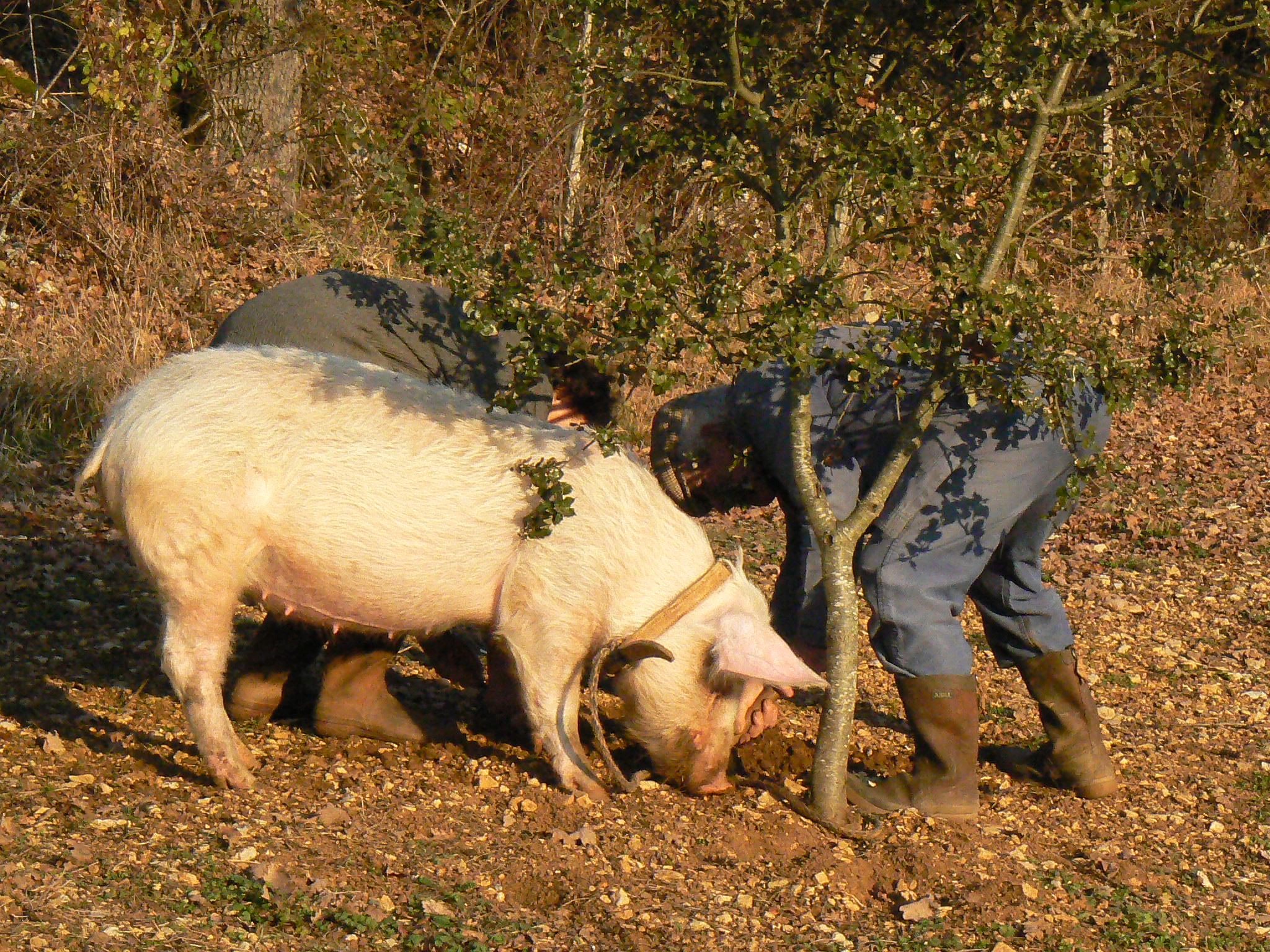
A trained pig using its sensitive nose to assist the search for wild truffles in France

Pigs have panoramic vision of approximately 310° and binocular vision of 35° to 50°. It is thought they have no eye accommodation. Other animals that have no accommodation, e.g. sheep, lift their heads to see distant objects. The extent to which pigs have colour vision is still a source of some debate; however, the presence of cone cells in the retina with two distinct wavelength sensitivities (blue and green) suggests that at least some colour vision is present.

Pigs have a well-developed sense of smell; this is exploited in Europe where trained pigs find underground truffles. Pigs have 1,113 genes for smell receptors, compared to 1,094 in dogs; this may indicate an acute sense of smell, but against this, insects have only around 50 to 100 such genes but make extensive use of olfaction. Olfactory rather than visual stimuli are used in the identification of other pigs. Hearing is well developed; sounds are localised by moving the head. Pigs use auditory stimuli extensively for communication in all social activities. Alarm or aversive stimuli are transmitted to other pigs not only by auditory cues but also by pheromones. Similarly, recognition between the sow and her piglets is by olfactory and vocal cues.

== Pests and diseases ==
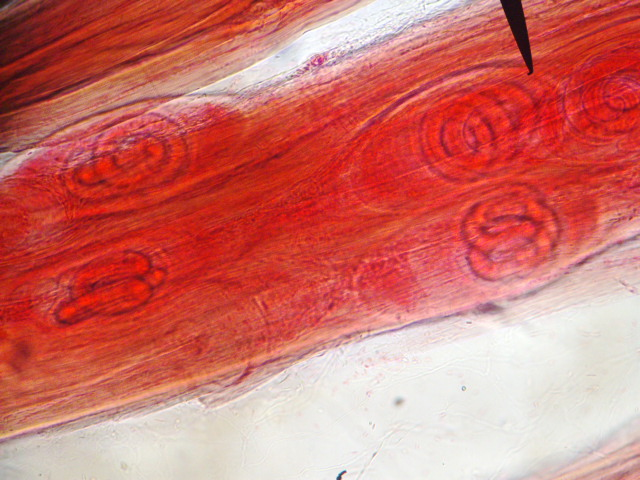
Trichinella spiralis larvae in uncooked pig meat

Pigs are subject to many pests and diseases which can seriously affect productivity and cause death. These include parasites such as Ascaris roundworms, virus diseases such as the tick-borne African Swine Fever, bacterial infections such as Clostridium, arthritis caused by Mycoplasma, and stillbirths caused by Parvovirus.

Some parasites of pigs are a public health risk as they can be transmitted to humans in undercooked pork. These are the pork tapeworm Taenia solium; a protozoan, Toxoplasma gondii; and a nematode, Trichinella spiralis. Transmission can be prevented by thorough sanitation on the farm; by meat inspection and careful commercial processing; and by thorough cooking, or alternatively by sufficient freezing and curing.

== Agriculture ==
Live pigs

=== Production ===
Pigs have been raised outdoors, and sometimes allowed to forage in woods or pastures. In industrialized nations, pig production has largely switched to large-scale intensive pig farming. This has lowered production costs but has caused concern about possible cruelty. As consumers have become concerned with the humane treatment of livestock, demand for pasture-raised pork in these nations has increased. Most pigs in the US receive ractopamine, a beta-agonist drug, which promotes muscle instead of fat and quicker weight gain, requiring less feed to reach finishing weight, and producing less manure. China has requested that pork exports be ractopamine-free. With a population of around 1 billion individuals, the domesticated pig is one of the most numerous large mammals on the planet.

Like all animals, pigs are susceptible to adverse impacts from climate change, such as heat stress from increased annual temperatures and more intense heatwaves. Heat stress has increased rapidly between 1981 and 2017 on pig farms in Europe. Installing a ground-coupled heat exchanger is an effective intervention.

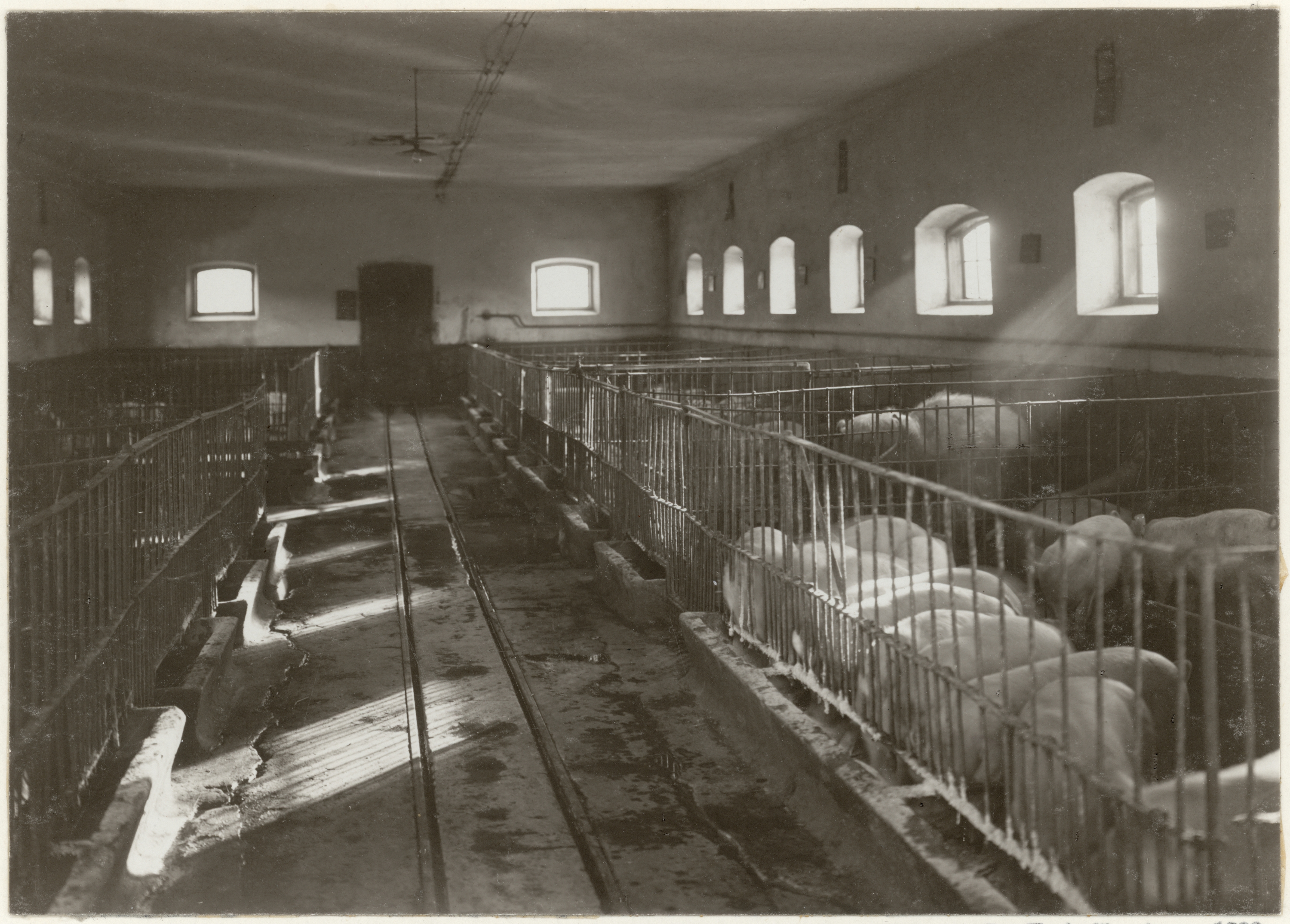
Indoor pig farm, Sweden, 1911

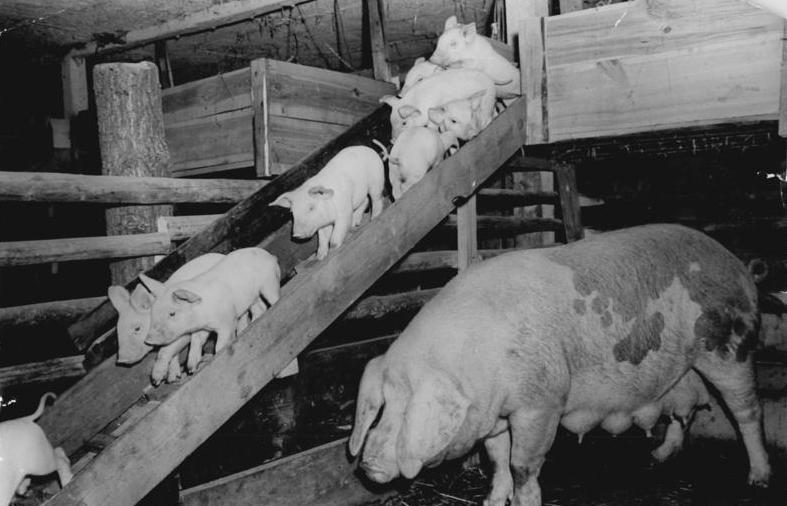
Sow in stall with separate piglet balcony to prevent crushing, Germany, 1959

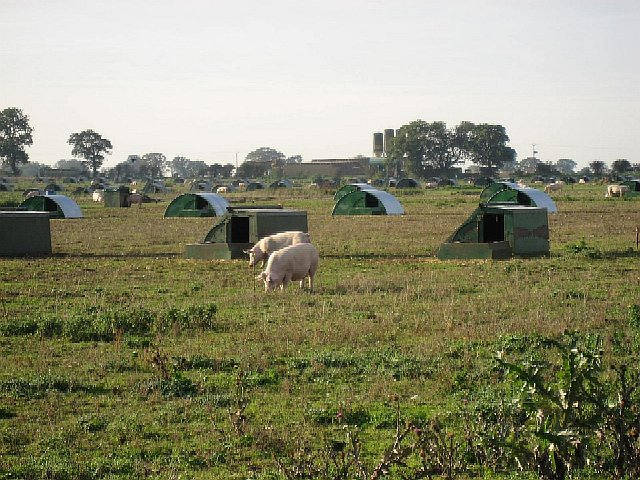
Free range pigs with field shelters, England, 2006
FAO data for 2021

Pork is tied with chicken as the most commonly consumed meat worldwide.

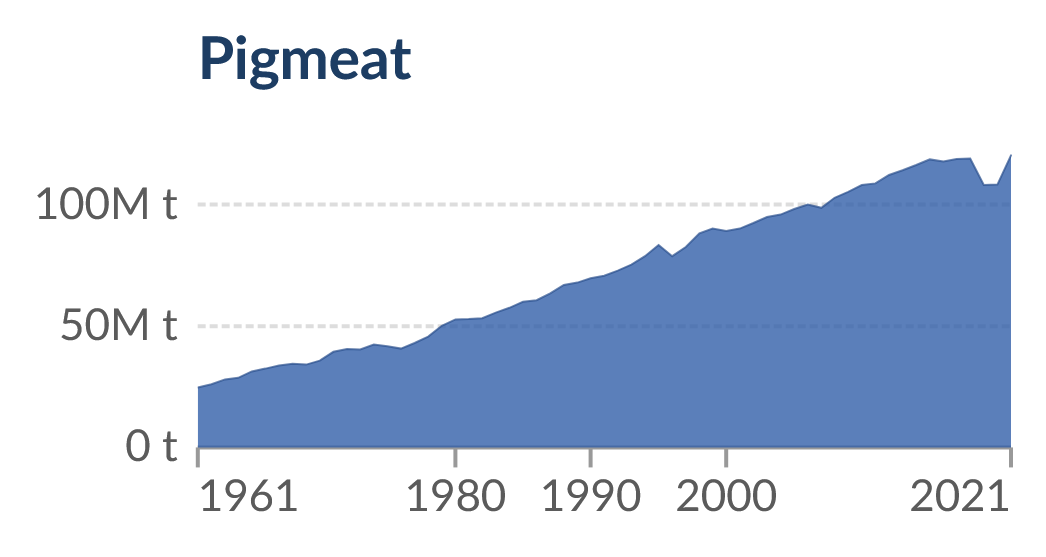
Pork production has grown substantially over the recent 60 years.

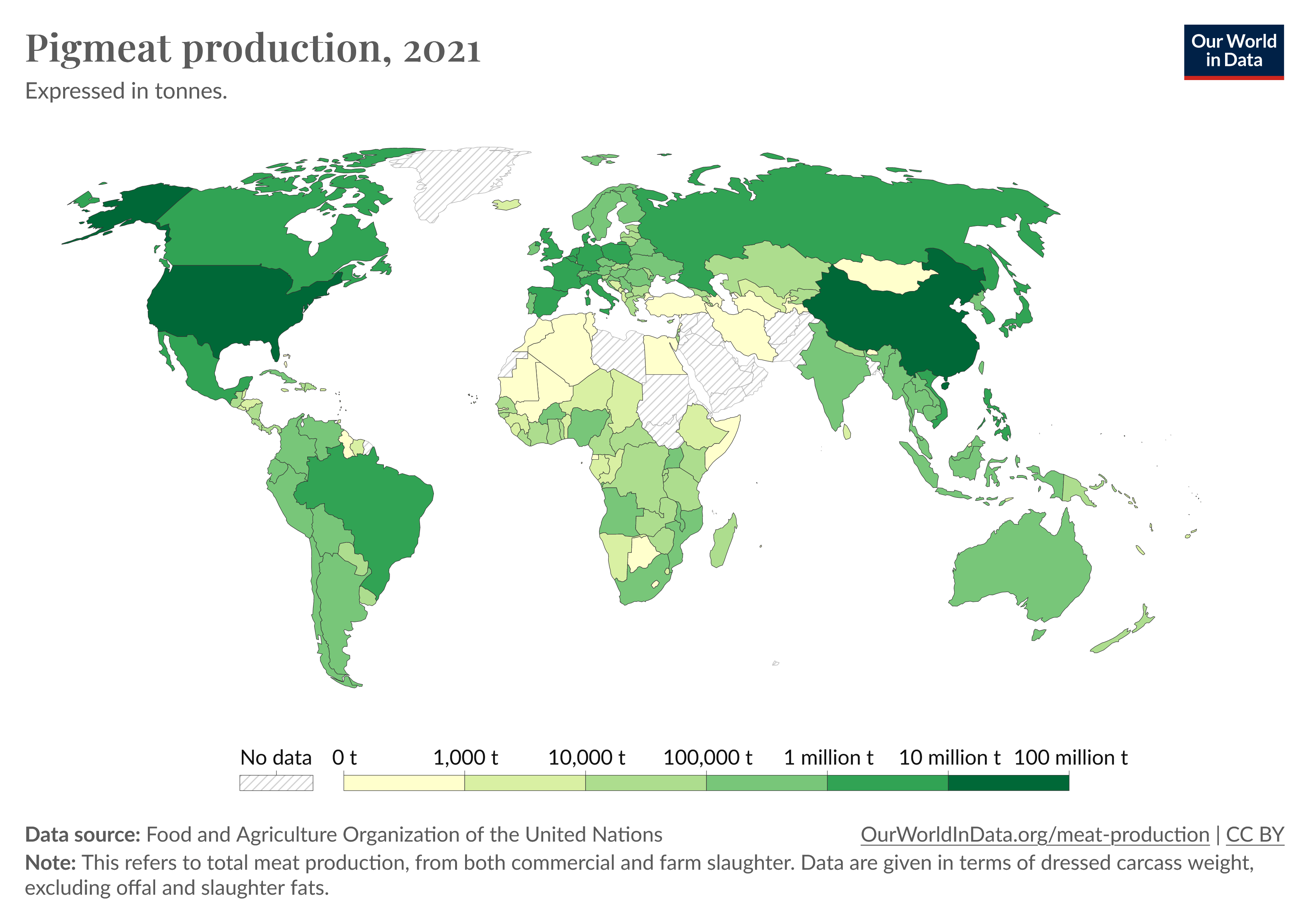
Production of pork worldwide, by country in 2021.

=== Breeds ===
Around 600 breeds of pig have been created by farmers around the world, mainly in Europe and Asia, differing in coloration, shape, and size. According to The Livestock Conservancy, as of 2016, three breeds of pig are critically rare (having a global population of fewer than 2000). They are the Choctaw hog, the Mulefoot, and the Ossabaw Island hog. The smallest known pig breed in the world is the Göttingen minipig, typically weighing about 26 kilograms (57 lb) as a healthy, full-grown adult.

== As pets ==
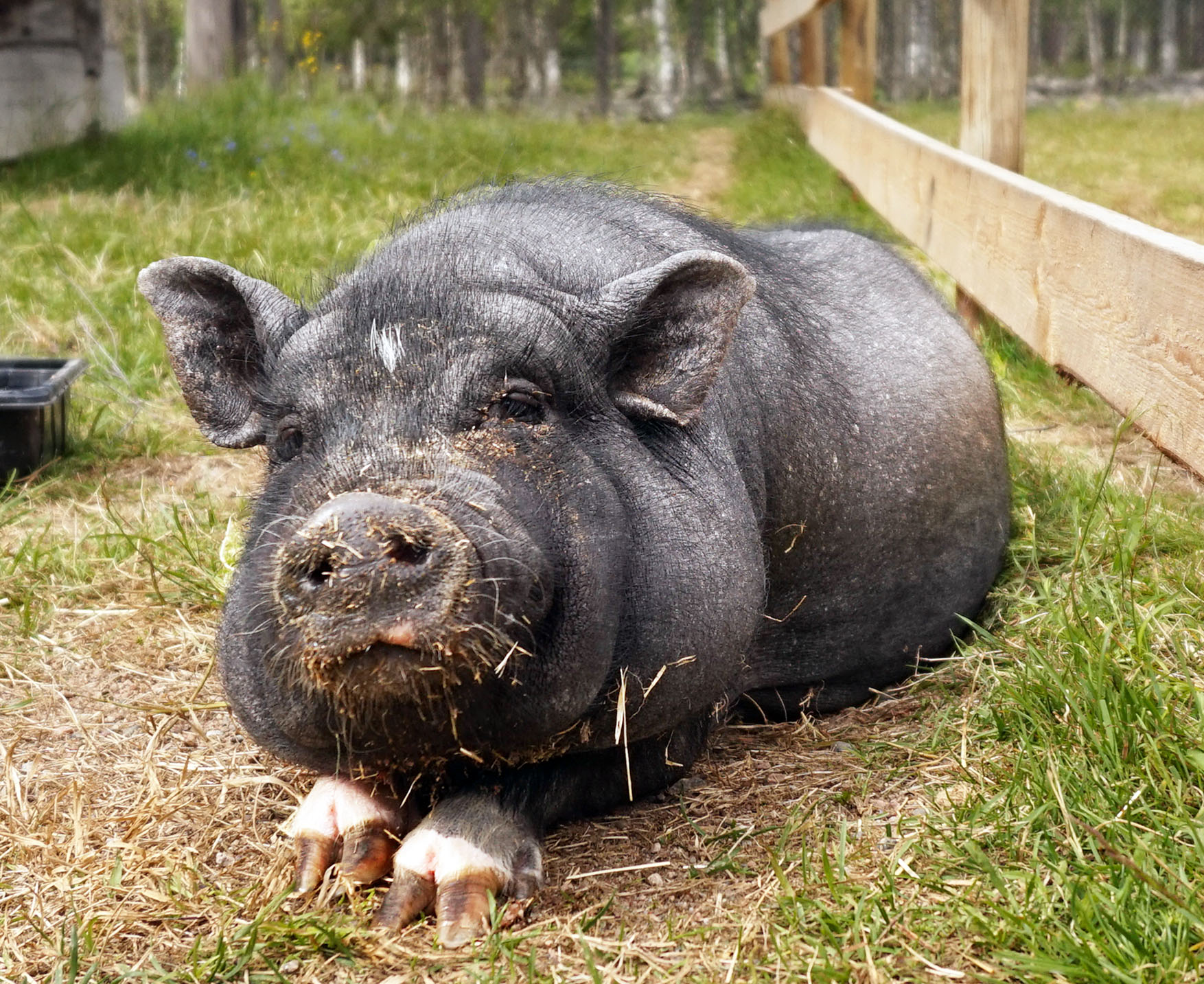
A mini pet pig

Given pigs are bred primarily as livestock and have not been bred as companion animals for very long, selective breeding for a placid or biddable temperament is not well established. Pigs have radically different psychology and behaviours compared to dogs, and exhibit fight-or-flight instincts, an independent nature, and natural assertiveness. Male and female swine that have not been de-sexed may express unwanted aggressive behavior, and are prone to serious health issues.

== Economy ==
Global pig stock
- in 2019

Number in millions
- 1. China (Mainland): 310.4 (36.5%)
- 2. European Union: 143.1 (16.83%)
- 3. United States: 78.7 (9.26%)
- 4. Brazil: 40.6 (4.77%)
- 5. Russia: 23.7 (2.79%)
- 6. Myanmar: 21.6 (2.54%)
- 7. Vietnam: 19.6 (2.31%)
- 8. Mexico: 18.4 (2.16%)
- 9. Canada: 14.1 (1.66%)
- 10. Philippines: 12.7 (1.49%)
- World total: 850.3

Approximately 1.5 billion pigs are slaughtered each year for meat.

The pork belly futures contract became an icon of commodities trading. It appears in depictions of the arena in popular entertainment, such as the 1983 film Trading Places. Trade in pork bellies declined, and they were delisted from the Chicago Mercantile Exchange in 2011.

In 2023, China produced more pork than any other country, 55 million tonnes, followed by the European Union with 22.8 million tonnes and the United States with 12.5 million tonnes. Global production in 2023 was 120 million tonnes. India, despite its large population, consumed under 0.3 million tonnes of pork in 2023. International trade in pork (meat not consumed in the producing country) reached 13 million tonnes in 2020.

== Uses ==
=== Products ===
Pigs are farmed primarily for meat, called pork. Pork is eaten in the form of pork chops, loin or rib roasts, shoulder joints, steaks, and loin (also called fillet). The many meat products made from pork include ham, bacon (mainly from the back and belly), and sausages. Pork is further made into charcuterie products such as terrines, galantines, pâtés and confits. Some sausages such as salami are fermented and air-dried, to be eaten raw. There are many types, the original Italian varieties including Genovese, Milanese, and Cacciatorino, with spicier kinds from the South of Italy including Calabrese, Napoletano, and Peperone.

The hide is made into pigskin leather, which is soft and durable; it can be brushed to form suede leather. These are used for products such as gloves, wallets, suede shoes, and leather jackets. In the 16th century, pig skin was the most popular book-binding material in Germany, though calf skin was more common elsewhere.

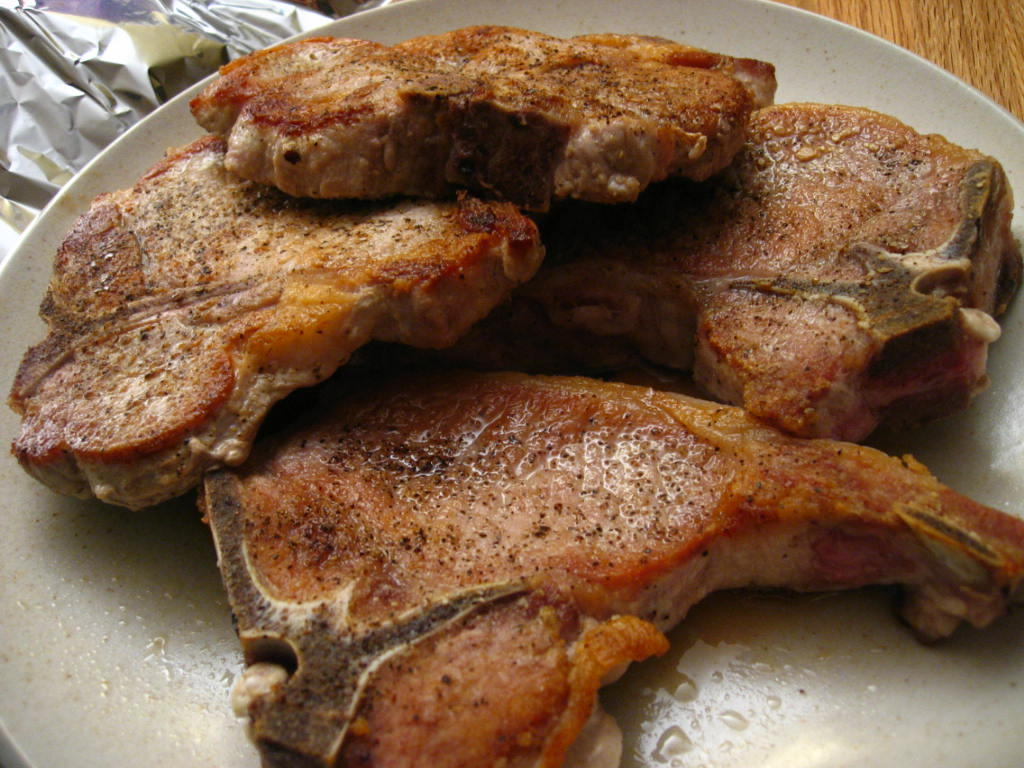
Pork chops

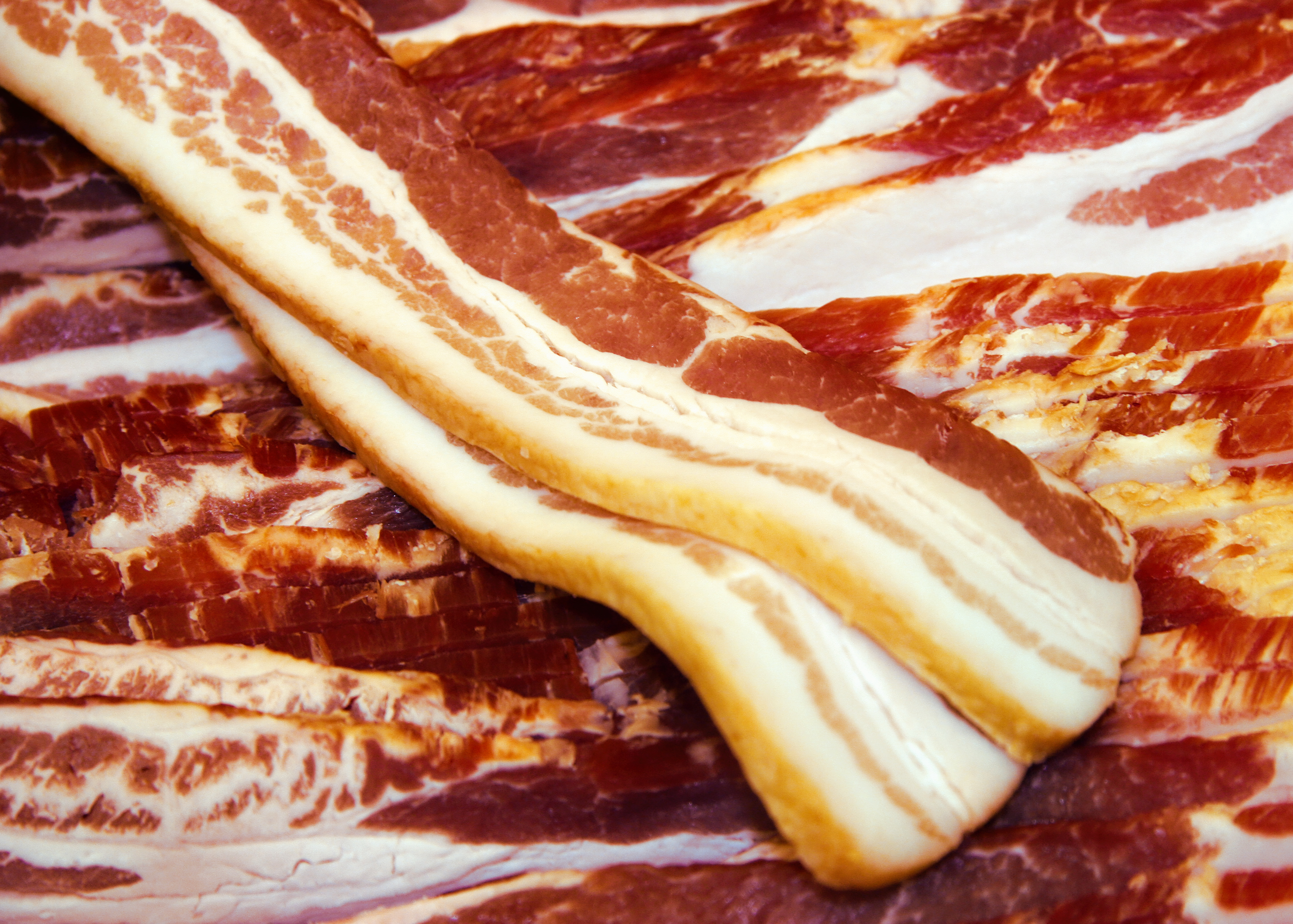
Streaky or side bacon

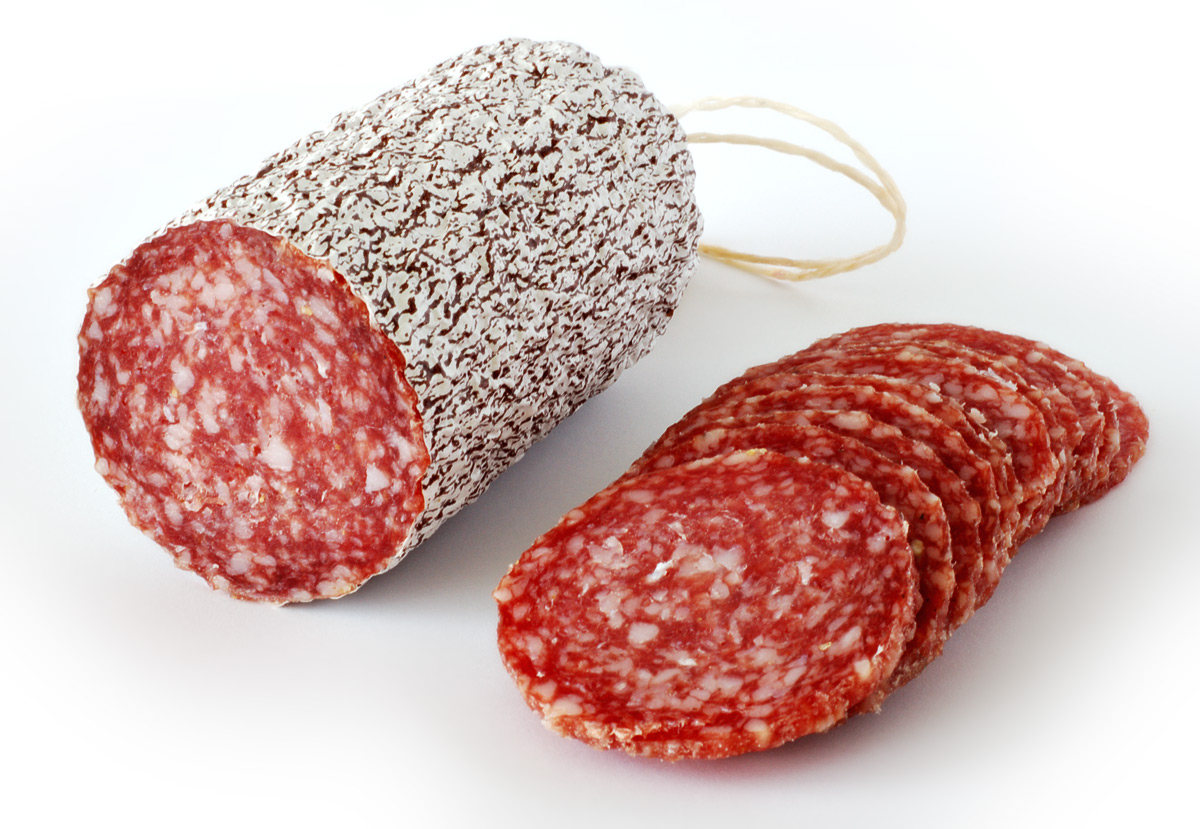
Salami, a fermented and air-dried sausage, originally made in Italy

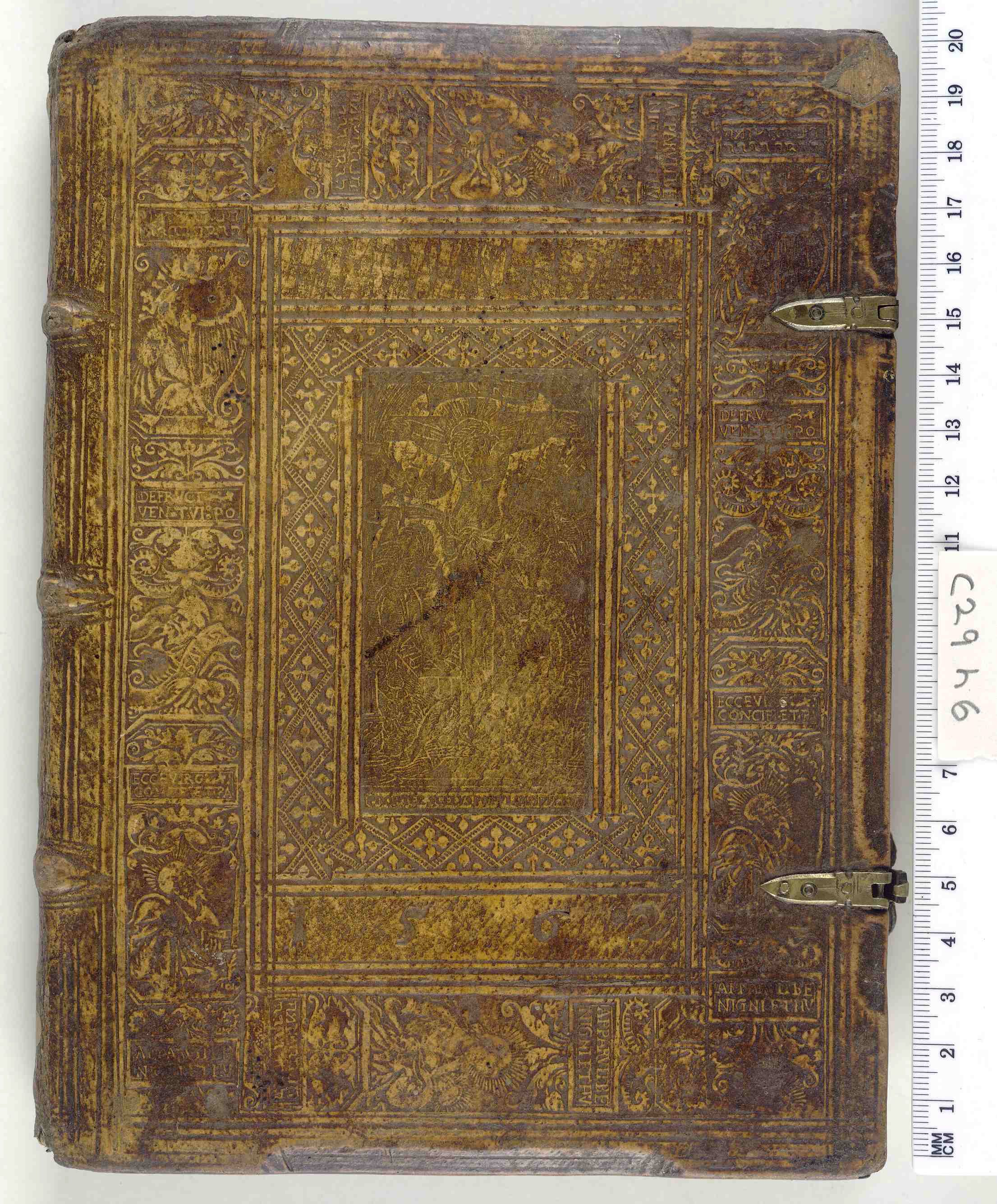
A 16th century book bound in pig skin

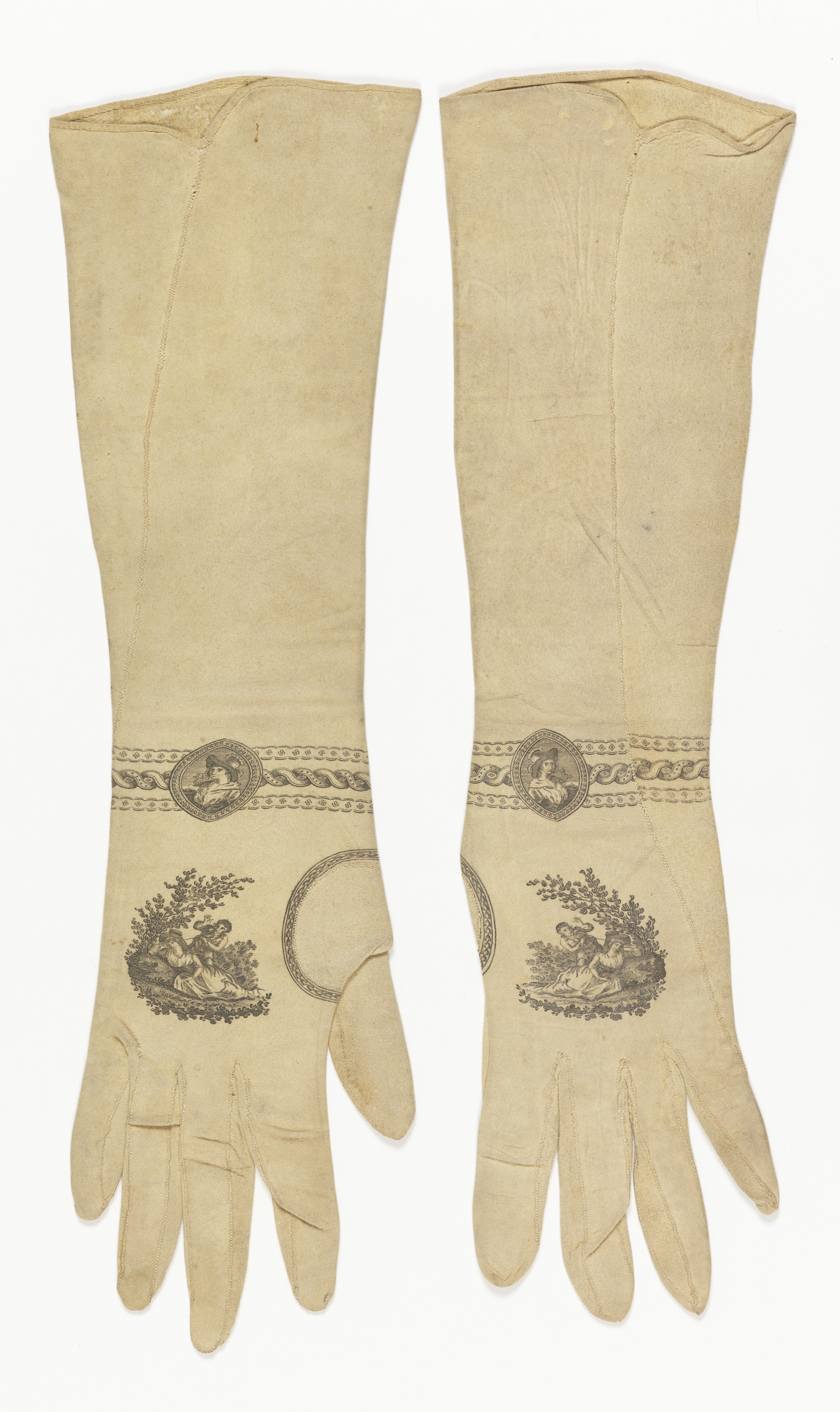
A woman's suede gloves,
England, c. 1820

=== In medicine ===
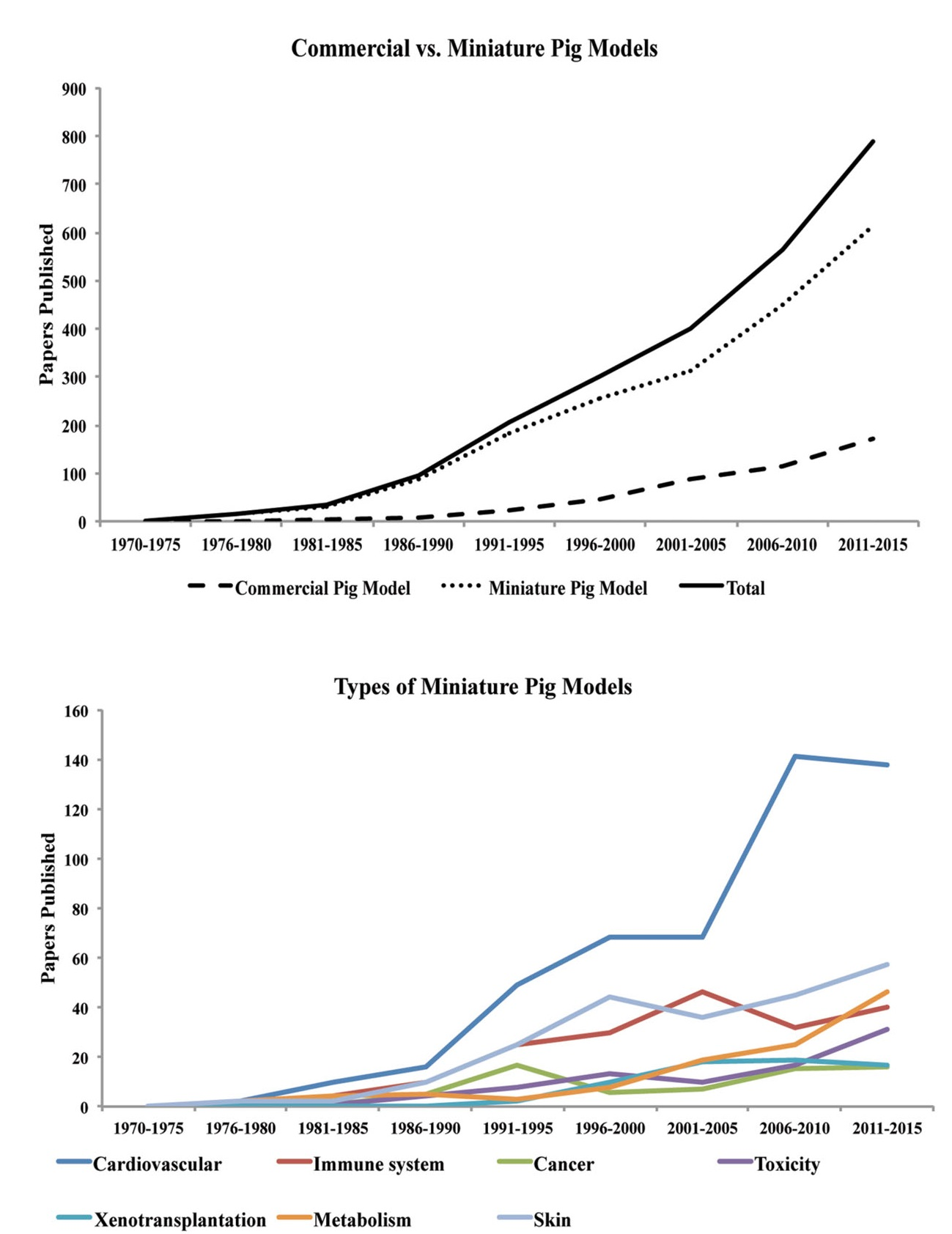
The growth in publication of medical research papers using pigs and miniature pigs, and the research done on miniature pigs by organ system

Pigs, both as live animals and as a source of post-mortem tissues, are valuable animal models because of their biological, physiological, and anatomical similarities to human beings. For instance, human skin is very similar to the pigskin, therefore pigskin has been used in many preclinical studies.

Pigs are good non-human candidates for organ donation to humans, and in 2021 became the first animal to successfully donate an organ to a human body. The procedure used a donor pig genetically engineered not to have a specific carbohydrate that the human body considers a threat–Galactose-alpha-1,3-galactose. Pigs are good for human donation as the risk of cross-species disease transmission is reduced by the considerable phylogenetic distance from humans. They are readily available, and the danger of creating new human diseases is low as domesticated pigs have been in close contact with humans for thousands of years.

== Impact of pig husbandry ==
=== On public health ===
Pig farms can serve as reservoirs of viral diseases that are dangerous to humans and so contribute to their outbreaks in human populations. The 2009 swine flu pandemic was caused by an influenza A variant which had first emerged in pigs. Pigs were also essential to the first outbreak of the Nipah virus in 1999, with 93% of the infected humans having had contact with pigs. While Japanese encephalitis is primarily spread by mosquitoes, pigs are a known intermediary host. There is also a potential for porcine coronaviruses such as porcine epidemic diarrhea virus or swine acute diarrhea syndrome coronavirus to spill over into human populations.

=== On the environment ===
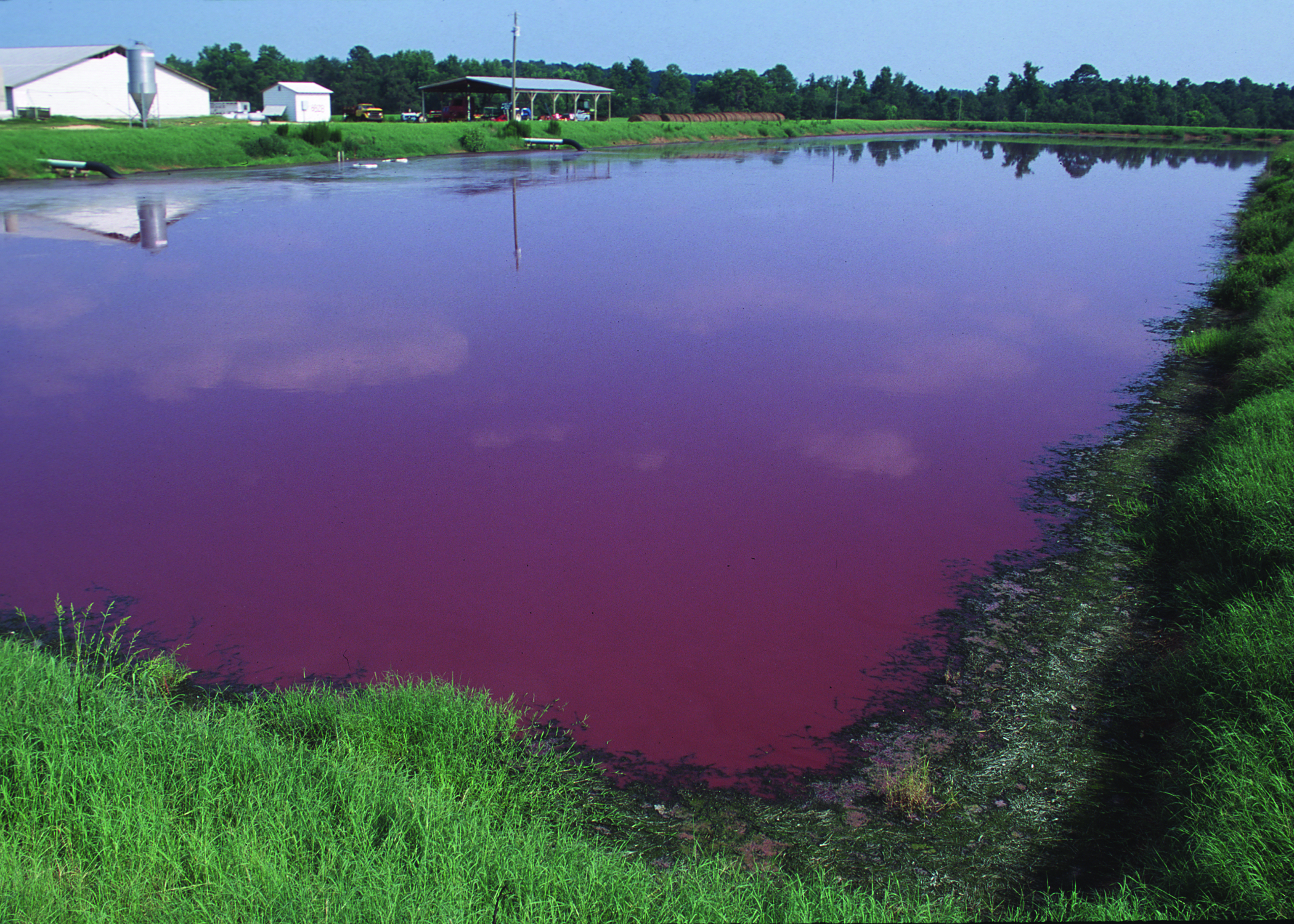
A typical waste lagoon in North Carolina

As with the other forms of meat, producing pork is more energy-intensive than plant-based foods, and it is associated with more greenhouse gas emissions per calorie. However, emissions from pork are many times smaller than those of beef, veal and mutton, though larger than of chicken meat.

Intensive pig production is also associated with water pollution concerns, as the swine waste is often stored above ground in so-called lagoons. These lagoons typically have high levels of nitrogen and phosphorus, and can contain toxic heavy metals like zinc and copper, microbial pathogens, or hold elevated concentrations of pharmaceuticals from subtherapeutic antibiotic use in swine. This wastewater from lagoons is liable to reach groundwater on farms, though there is little evidence for it reaching deeper into local drinking water supplies. However, lagoon spills, such as from heavy rains in the wake of a hurricane, can lead to fish kills and algal blooms in local rivers. In the United States, 35,000 mi (56,000 km) of river across over 20 states were estimated to have been contaminated by manure leakage as of 2015. There is also evidence that evaporation from lagoons can cause nitrogen and phosphorus to spread through the air as dry particles then reach other water basins when they fall out through dry deposition. This process then also contributes to water eutrophication.

=== On animal welfare ===
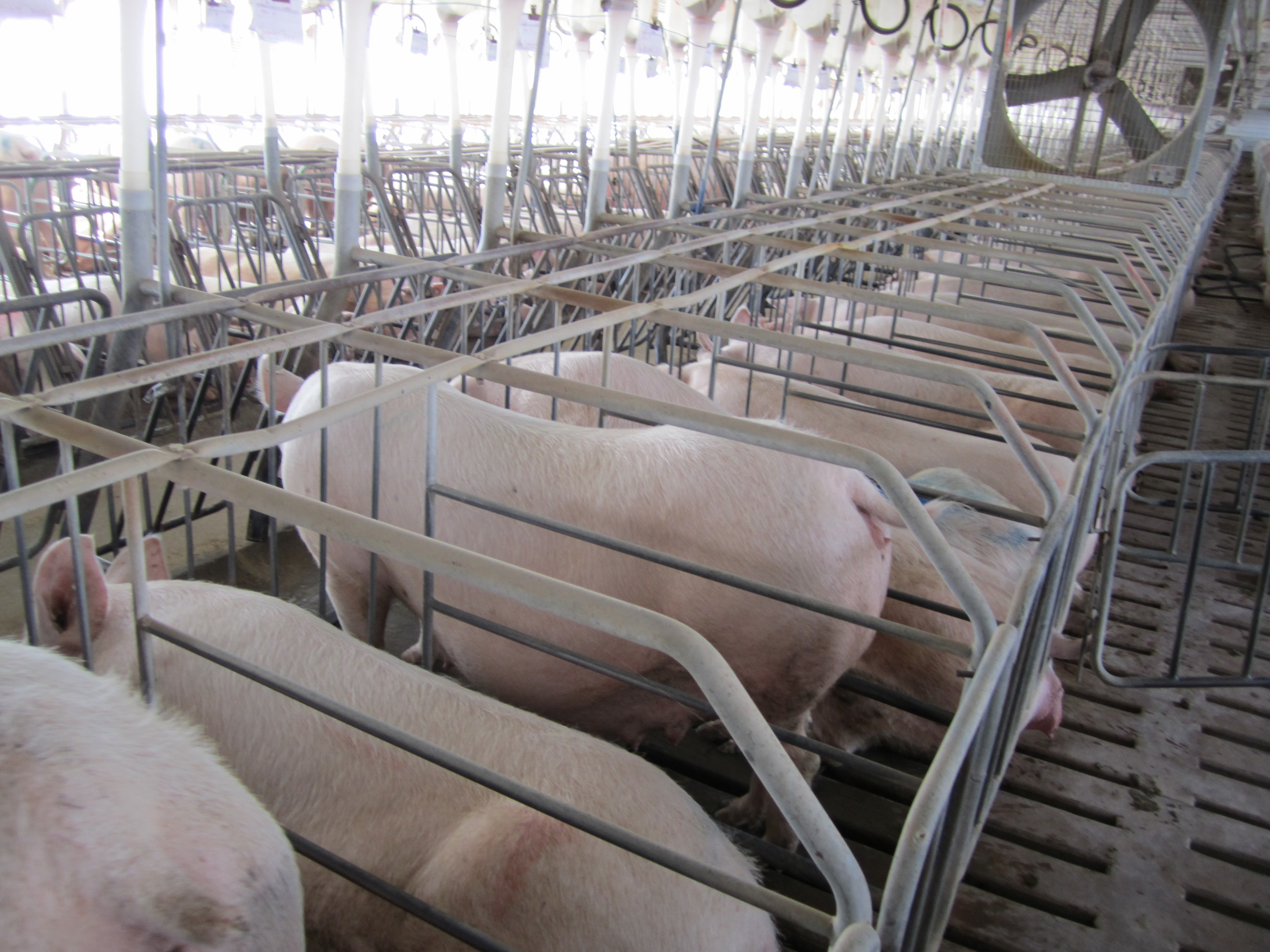
Sows in gestation crates, United States, 2010

Intensive pig production involves practices such as castration, earmarking, tattooing for litter identification, tail docking, which are often done without the use of anesthetic. Painful teeth clipping of piglets is also done to curtail cannibalism, behavioural instability and aggression, and tail biting, which are induced by the cramped environment. In English indoor farming, young pigs (less than 110kg in weight) are allowed to be kept with less than one square meter of space per pig.

Pigs often begin life in a farrowing or gestation crate, which is a small pen with a central cage, designed to allow the piglets to feed from their mother while preventing her from attacking or crushing them. The crates are so small that the mother sows cannot turn around. While wild piglets remain with their mothers for around 12 to 14 weeks, farmed piglets are weaned and removed from their mothers at between two and five weeks old. Of the piglets born alive, 10% to 18% will not reach weaning age, instead succumbing to disease, starvation, dehydration, or accidental crushing by their mothers. Unusually small runt piglets are typically killed immediately by staff through blunt trauma to the head. Further, intensive farming involves sows giving birth to large litters at an unnatural frequency, which increases the rate of stillborn piglets. On some farms, 25% to 50% of sow deaths come from prolapse.

== In culture ==
Pigs, widespread in societies around the world since Neolithic times, have been used for many purposes in art, literature, and other expressions of human culture. In classical times, the Romans considered pork the finest of meats, enjoying sausages, and depicting them in their art. Across Europe, pigs have been celebrated in carnivals since the Middle Ages, becoming specially important in Medieval Germany in cities such as Nuremberg, and in Early Modern Italy in cities such as Bologna. Pigs, especially miniature breeds, are occasionally kept as pets.

In literature, both for children and adults, pig characters appear in allegories, comic stories, and serious novels. In art, pigs have been represented in a wide range of media and styles from the earliest times in many cultures. Pig names are used in idioms and animal epithets, often derogatory, since pigs have long been linked with dirtiness and greed, while places such as Swindon are named for their association with swine. The eating of pork is forbidden in Islam and Judaism, but pigs are sacred in some other religions.

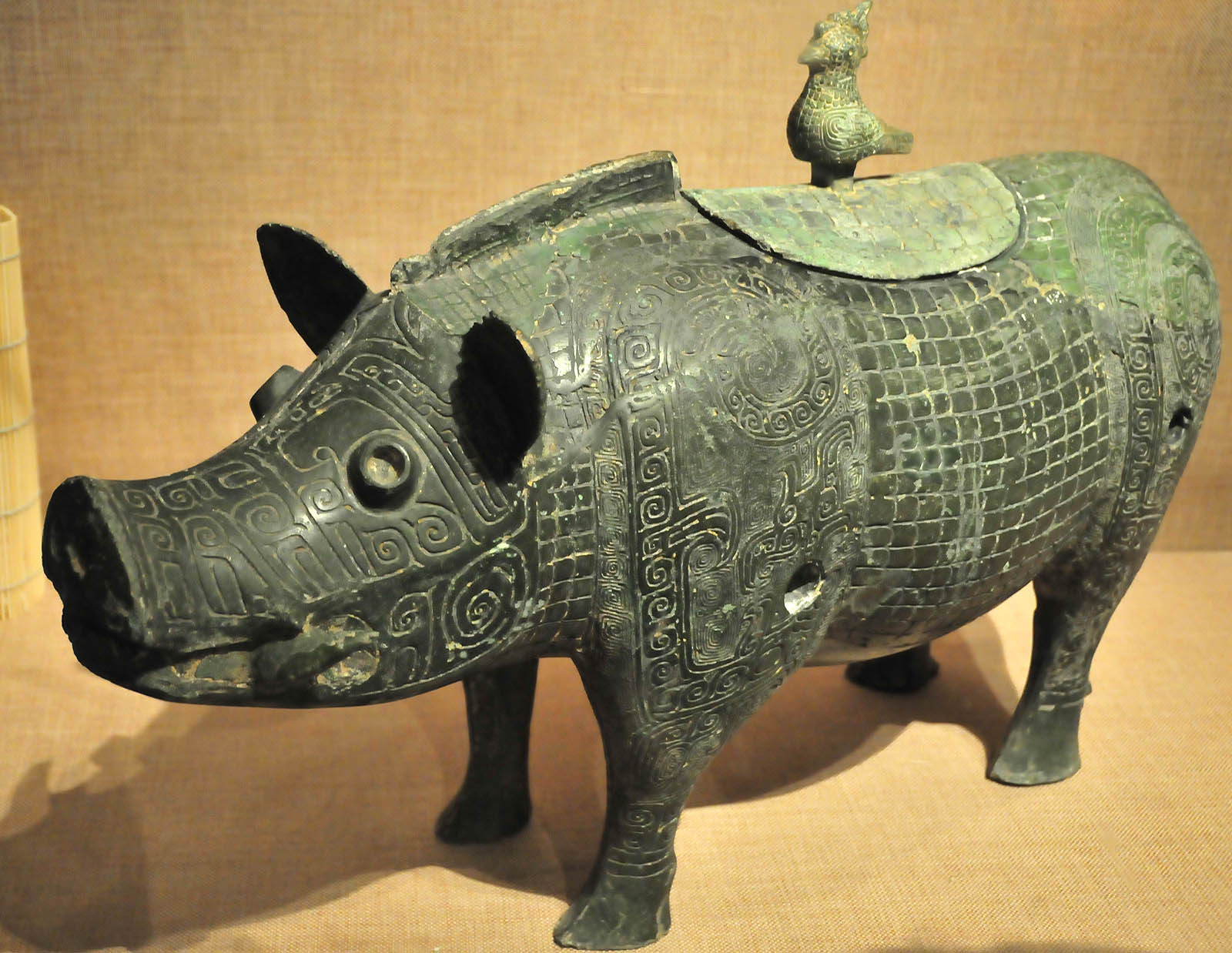
Bronze pig sculpture, Zhou dynasty

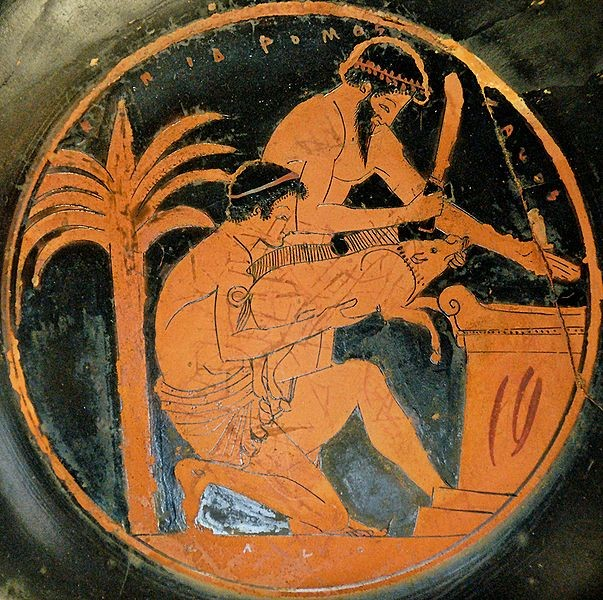
Two men sacrificing a pig to Demeter. Red-figure pot, Ancient Greece

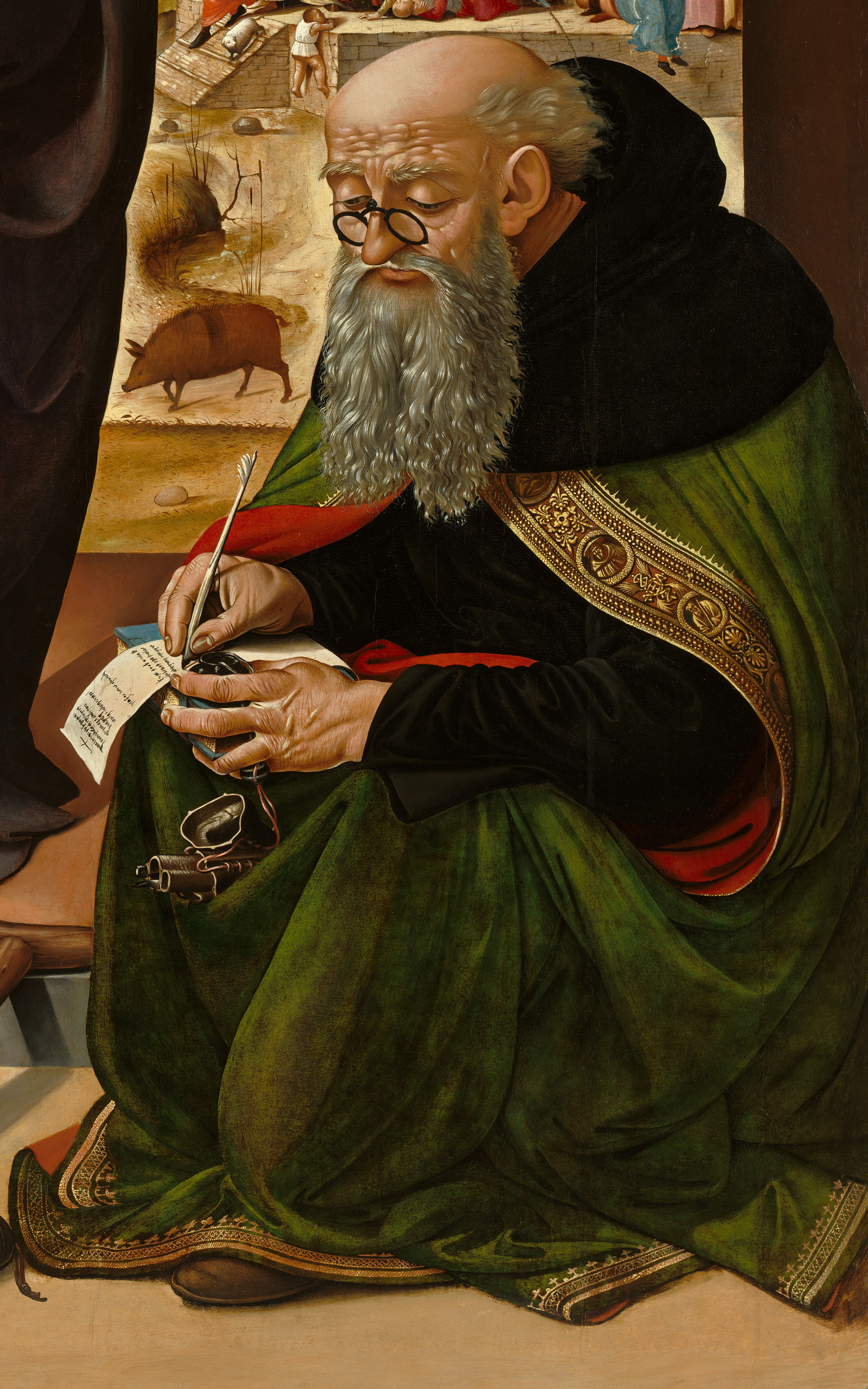
Painting of Saint Anthony with a pig in background by Piero di Cosimo c. 1480

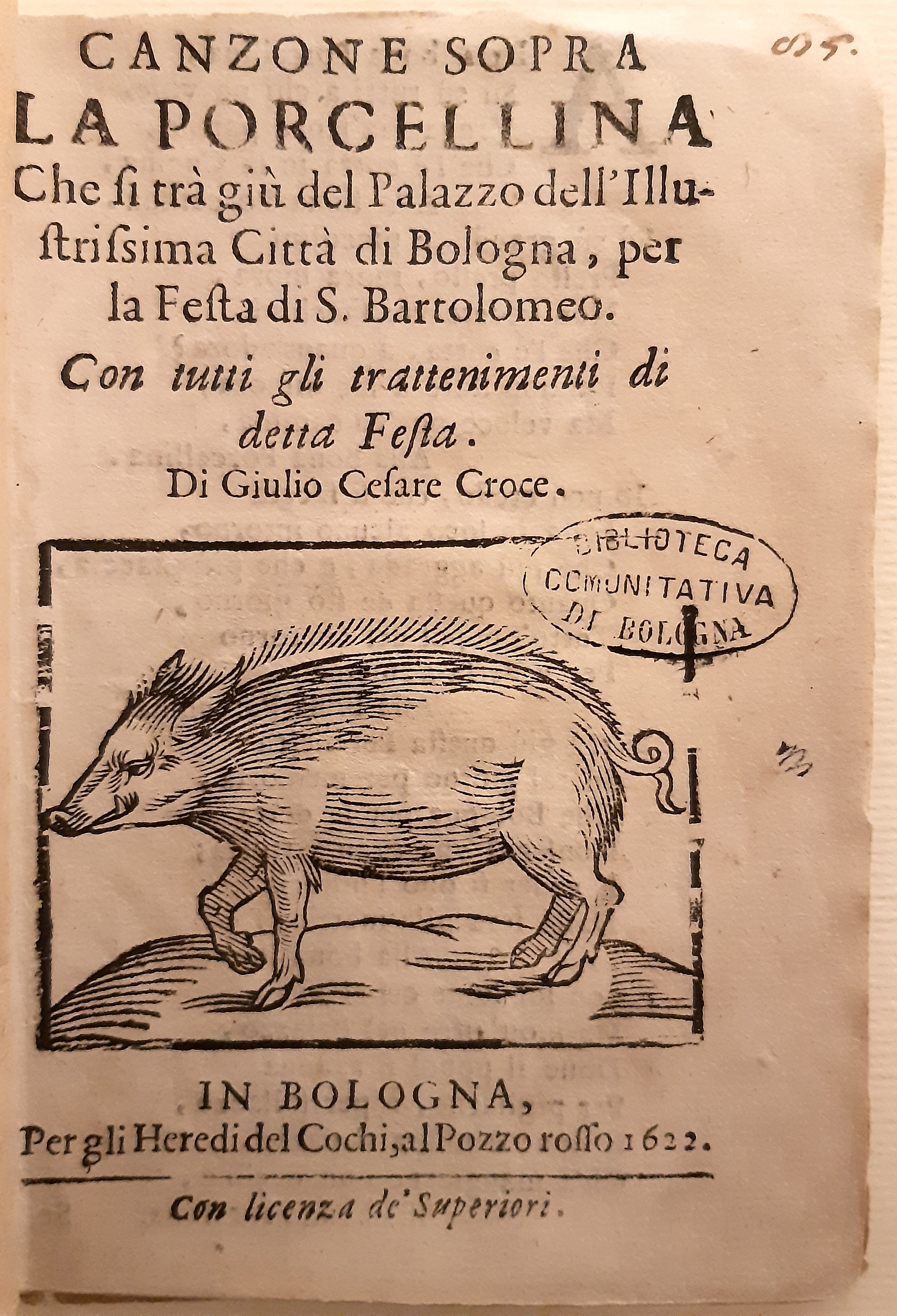
Canzone Sopra La Porcellina ("Song Upon the Piglet") by Giulio Cesare Croce, Bologna, 1622

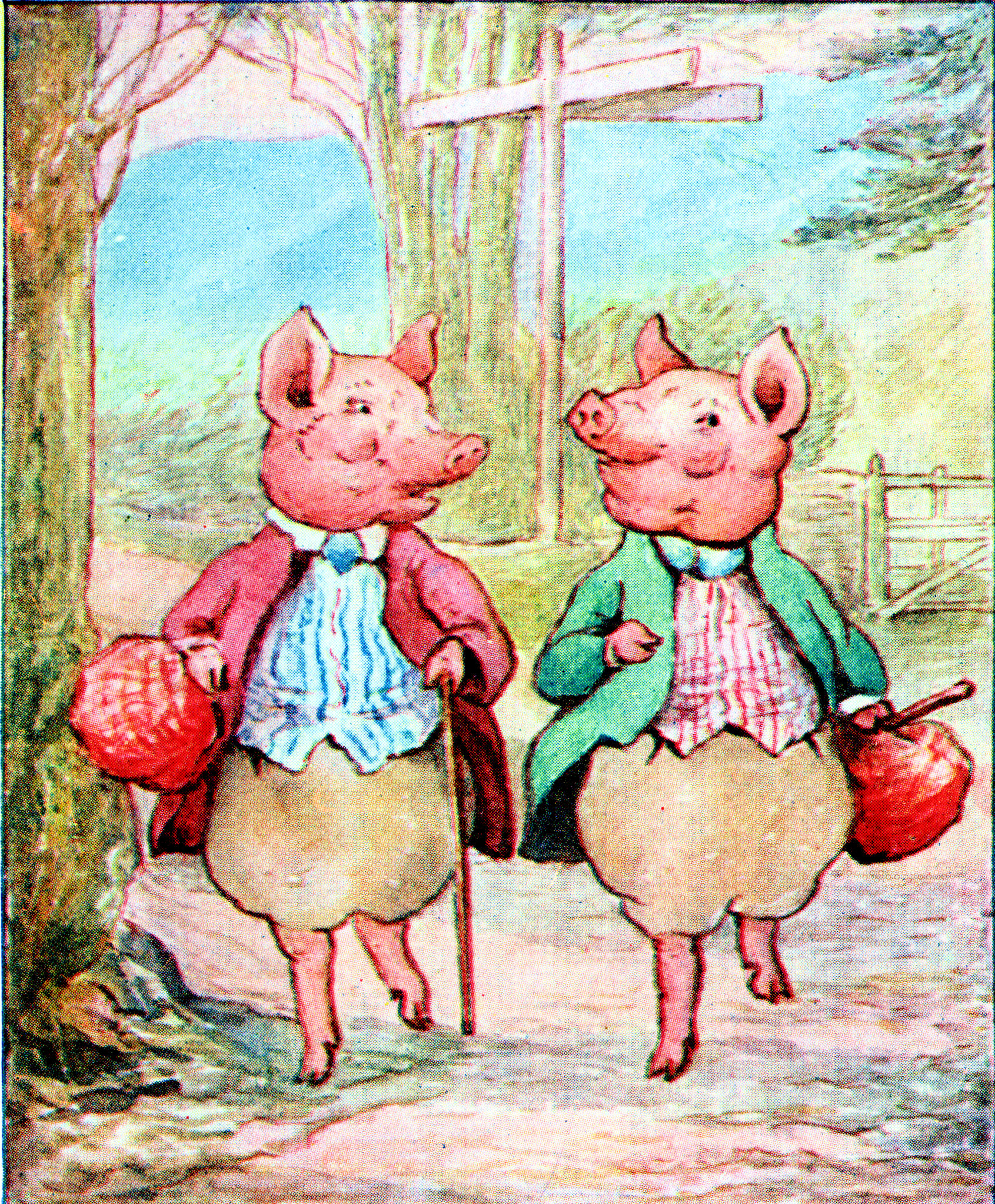
Pigling Bland setting out on his adventures

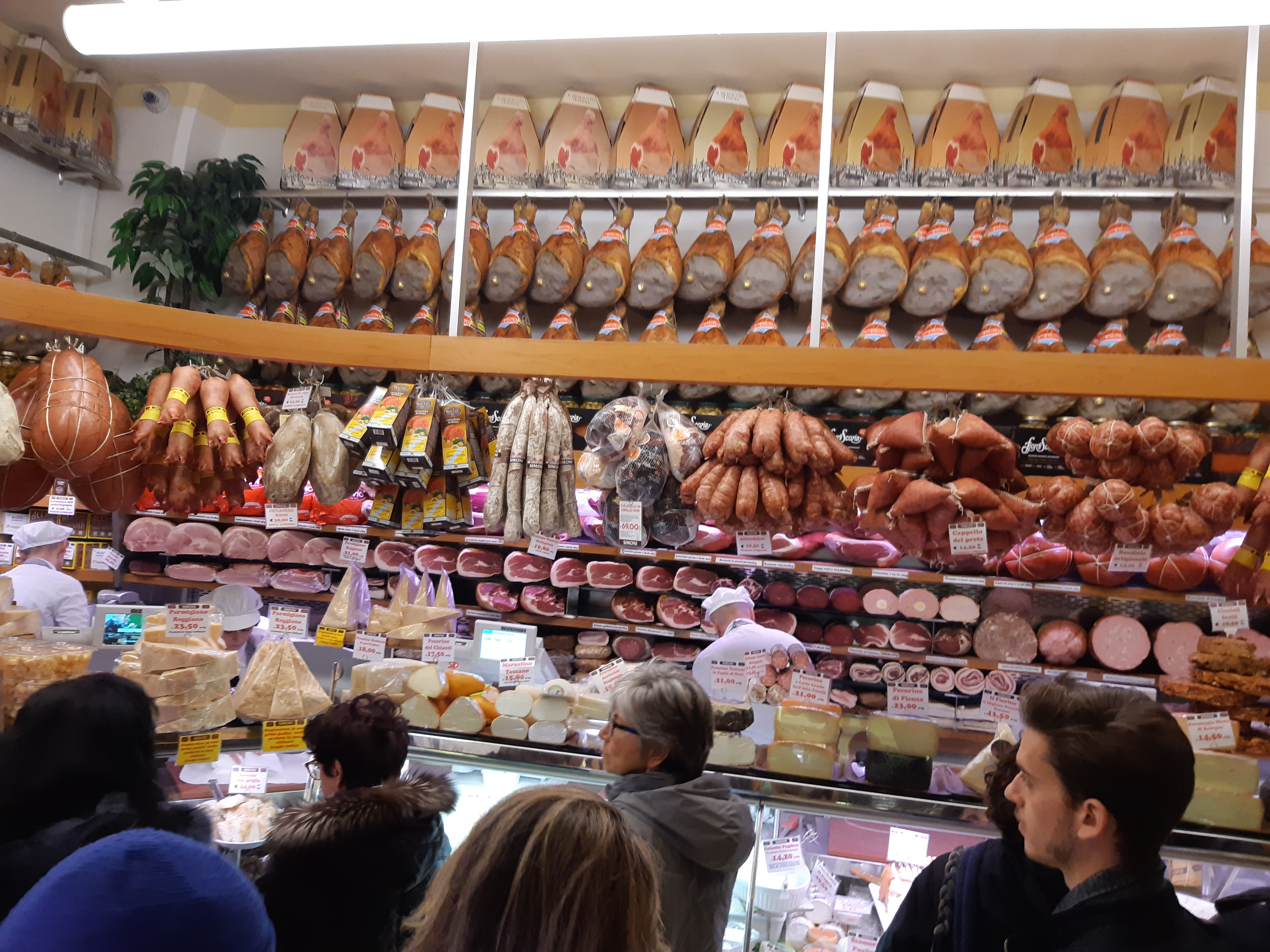
Hams, pig's trotters, sausages, and mortadella in Bologna, 2019
