= Cali Fund =

Fund to finance biodiversity conservation

The Cali Fund, also known as the Cali Fund for the Fair and Equitable Sharing of Benefits from the Use of Digital Sequence Information on Genetic Resources (DSI), is a global financial mechanism established under the Convention on Biological Diversity (CBD) to facilitate fair and equitable sharing of benefits from the use of DSI.

Launched on February 25, 2025, in Rome, Italy, during the resumed session of the 16th Conference of the Parties (COP 16) to the CBD, the fund aims to mobilize resources from private sector entities utilizing digital sequence information (DSI) on genetic resources, ensuring equitable benefit-sharing with biodiversity-rich countries, indigenous peoples, and local communities.

== History ==
Discussions on the need for a global benefit-sharing mechanism for Digital Sequence Information (DSI) date back to the early 2010s, following the adoption of the Nagoya Protocol on Access and Benefit-Sharing (ABS) in 2010. While the protocol established rules for sharing benefits from physical genetic resources, it did not explicitly address DSI on genetic resources, leading to ongoing debates about its legal status and governance.

By 2016, the issue gained prominence in the Convention on Biological Diversity (CBD) negotiations, as many biodiversity-rich nations argued that open access to DSI without compensation amounted to digital biopiracy. The 2018 CBD Conference of the Parties (COP14) acknowledged these concerns and initiated expert consultations to explore policy options for DSI governance. These discussions laid the groundwork for the inclusion of a multilateral benefit-sharing mechanism in the Kunming-Montreal Global Biodiversity Framework (KMGBF) that was adopted at COP15 in Montreal, Canada, in December 2022.

The framework included provisions for a multilateral mechanism to share benefits from DSI, addressing long-standing concerns about biopiracy and the fair distribution of profits derived from genetic resources. The operationalization of this mechanism, including the establishment of the Cali Fund, was finalized at the 2024 United Nations Biodiversity Conference of the Parties (COP16) in Cali, Colombia, on November 2, 2024, through Decision 16/2.

Parallel to the CBD negotiations, the World Intellectual Property Organization Intergovernmental Committee on Intellectual Property and Genetic Resources, Traditional Knowledge and Folklore (WIPO-IGC) has been dealing with the intersection of intellectual property rights and genetic resources since its establishment in 2001. The WIPO-IGC has addressed means of preventing the misappropriation of genetic resources and associated traditional knowledge, often concurrent with DSI, through patents and other IP tools. Its contribution informed the construction of the Cali Fund under the principle to promote equitable benefit-sharing systems together with intellectual property regimes but protect the rights of indigenous and local communities.

The fund is named after Cali, Colombia, where COP 16 was initially held from October 21 to November 1, 2024, reflecting the city's significance as a biodiversity hotspot and the site of key negotiations.

== Purpose ==
The Cali Fund supports the three core objectives of the CBD

- Conservation of biological diversity
- Sustainable use of components of biological diversity
- Fair and equitable sharing of benefits arising from the use of genetic resources

It aims to generate new funding streams for biodiversity action worldwide by collecting contributions from private sector entities that profit from DSI, particularly in industries such as pharmaceuticals, biotechnology, and agriculture.

== Structure and governance ==
The Cali Fund is hosted by the Multi-Partner Trust Fund Office (MPTFO) in partnership with the United Nations Development Programme (UNDP) and the United Nations Environment Programme (UNEP). Based in Montreal, Canada, the CBD Secretariat oversees the fund's secretariat. A Memorandum of Understanding formalizing this arrangement was signed during the launch ceremony in Rome.

The fund's governance includes a steering committee and an Ad Hoc Technical Expert Group on Allocation Methodology to refine contribution rates and distribution methods.

== Funding mechanism ==
Companies benefiting commercially from DSI are requested to contribute either 1% of their profits or 0.1% of their revenue to the Cali Fund, as agreed at COP 16. This could potentially generate tens of billions of dollars annually, depending on participation from sectors like pharmaceuticals, cosmetics, and agricultural biotechnology. Academic institutions, public research bodies, and non-commercial entities are exempt from contributions.

At least 50% of the fund's resources will be allocated to the self-identified needs of indigenous peoples and local communities, recognizing their role as custodians of biodiversity. The United Nations Declaration on the Rights of Indigenous Peoples (UNDRIP), adopted by the United Nations General Assembly on 13 September 2007, and the United Nations Declaration on the Rights of Peasants and Other People Working in Rural Areas (UNDROP), adopted on 17 December 2018, prioritize indigenous and rural peoples' rights to their traditional knowledge and resources.

The Cali Fund's dedication to investing at least 50% of its capital in these groups is a testament to the emphasis on self-determination under UNDRIP and fair access to resources under UNDROP. However, the reliance of the fund on corporate goodwill rather than legally binding rights has been questioned regarding its ability to enforce these declarations, with demands for stronger legal protections.

== Launch and reception ==
The Cali Fund was officially launched on February 25, 2025, at the Food and Agriculture Organization (FAO) headquarters in Rome, during the resumed session of COP 16, following the suspension of the original meeting in Cali due to a loss of quorum. H.E. Susana Muhamad, COP 16 President and former Colombian Minister of Environment, hailed it as a "major achievement" for biodiversity, emphasizing Colombia's pride in its inception. UNEP Deputy Executive Director Elizabeth Mrema described the fund as significant step towards fairness and equity for all. "The rush to access that gold mine of genetic data must not leave behind the communities which protect these precious natural resources. That's where the Cali Fund is a game-changer," she noted.

Statements from indigenous representatives, such as Norberto Farekatde of the Uitoto people in Colombia, highlighted a strong desire for direct involvement in decision-making processes tied to the fund, reflecting both optimism and a call for meaningful participation. The CBD Secretariat's commitment to involving indigenous groups in consultations, with deadlines for submissions set for March and April 2025, further reinforced this commitment, signaling a new era of inclusion in biodiversity finance.

Astrid Schomaker, Executive Secretary of the CBD, described its historic significance as the first global fund of the CBD to receive endowments from the private sector, referring to it as "a concrete expression of business commitment to give back to nature."

The private sector's response to the Cali Fund's launch was more mixed, balancing cautious support with concerns over implementation. While some business leaders, such as those represented by the World Business Council for Sustainable Development (WBCSD), embraced the fund as an opportunity to integrate biodiversity into economic sectors, others expressed uncertainty about contribution rates and economic competitiveness, issues the CBD Secretariat plans to clarify in 2025. The exemption of academic and non-commercial entities softened some resistance, but the private sector remains in a wait-and-see mode as operational details unfold.

== Future developments ==
The Cali Fund focuses on benefit sharing of DSI in line with the equity principles of the High Seas Treaty, formally known as the Biodiversity Beyond National Jurisdiction (BBNJ) Agreement, which was adopted by the United Nations in June 2023. BBNJ addresses ocean biodiversity in areas beyond national jurisdiction and mandates benefit-sharing for genetic resources found in the high seas. Without harmonizing these frameworks, fragmented governance could weaken efforts to prevent biopiracy, a challenge that the ongoing development of the Cali Fund must address.

The establishment of the operational framework of the Cali Fund began in December 2024, with the CBD Secretariat initiating consultations on contribution modalities and allocation strategies. Further details, including national implementation measures and precise allocation formulas, are expected to be refined at COP 17 in 2026.

== See also ==
- Digital Sequence Information
- Convention on Biological Diversity
