= Access and Benefit Sharing Agreement =

An Access and Benefit Sharing Agreement (ABSA) is an agreement that defines the fair and equitable sharing of benefits arising from the use of genetic resources. ABSAs typically arise in relation to bioprospecting where indigenous knowledge is used to focus screening efforts for commercially valuable genetic and biochemical resources. ABSAs recognise that bioprospecting frequently relies on indigenous or traditional knowledge, and that people or communities who hold such knowledge are entitled to a share of benefits arising from its commercial utilization.

== History and development ==
The concept of ABSAs stems from the Convention on Biological Diversity which, among other objectives, seeks to ensure the fair and equitable sharing of benefits arising from genetic resources. However, the highly controversial principle of Access and Benefit Sharing of the CDB stirred up a virulent debate which left most stakeholders unsatisfied with the framework provided.

The Nagoya Protocol, a supplementary agreement to the Convention on Biological Diversity, provides a legal framework for implementing that objective. Article 5 of the Nagoya Protocol requires that benefits arising from the utilization of genetic resources, as well as from subsequent applications and commercialization, to be shared in a fair and equitable way with the party providing such resources. Article 5 states that such sharing shall be upon mutually agreed terms. An ABSA can be used to specify the terms on which the benefits will be shared in a particular case.

== The Pre CBD situation ==
Plant genetic resources were treated as common heritage of mankind before the CBD came into force, they could be freely exchanged for plant breeding and scientific research. The common heritage approach has been criticized, particularly those from developing countries, because such a perception meant that their biological resources would be considered free to exploit without compensation, and the exploitation of their genetic resources would then lead to the commercialization of these products in industrialized nations. The third resolution of the Twenty-Sixth Session of the FAO Conference held in 1991 marked the beginning of departure from the common heritage approach, which recognized that the concept was subject to the sovereignty of the states over their genetic resources.

The CBD, which came into effect in 1992, acknowledged that each state had sovereign rights over the genetic resources found in its territory and gave the state government power to make decisions about access to these resources, unlike earlier agreements that regarded genetic resources as common heritage. Article 15 also states that the parties shall facilitate access to genetic resources for environmental sound purposes and shall share the results of their research and commercial benefits fairly and equitably.

Commentators have nevertheless described the access and benefit-sharing provisions of the CBD as being too vague to be effectively implemented in practice, which prompted the adoption of the non-binding Bonn Guidelines of the CBD in 2002 and ultimately the Nagoya Protocol itself. The Nagoya Protocol, which was adopted in 2010 and entered into force in 2014, provides a more concrete legal framework for the benefit-sharing aim of the CBD by mandating parties to ensure that access to genetic resources takes place with prior informed consent and on mutually agreed terms, and setting up compliance mechanisms for those users in other jurisdictions, such as the ABS Clearing-House for exchanging information on national laws, permits and ABSA. Buck the European Commission's lead negotiator for the protocol has characterized the Protocol as an important, albeit not entirely achieved, step towards implementing the CBD's benefit-sharing objective through effective legal obligations.

== Recent Developments ==
In the Kunming-Montreal Global Biodiversity Framework adopted at CBD COP15 held in December 2022, there is Target 13 which commits parties to legal and policy measures to ensure that benefits derived from genetic resources and digital sequence information and associated traditional knowledge are shared fairly and equitably and that there is a significant increase in benefits shared by 2030. However, when evaluating early implementation, it has been observed that there are certain complications involved in the measurement of such a milestone due to the non-financial nature of the benefits, making it more difficult to measure compared to financial benefits.

== Components ==
An ABSA usually stems from bioprospecting, whereby an individual or an organization engages in searching biological materials for valuable characteristics, usually through the traditional knowledge held by the communities that have been using the said organisms for a considerable period of time; an ABSA defines the conditions of the access and benefit sharing. ABS commonly includes the following elements.

Prior Informed Consent (PIC) refers to the process of gaining consent from the competent national authority of the country whose biological materials are going to be accessed, and also from the Indigenous peoples or local communities possessing the traditional knowledge.

Mutually Agreed Terms (MAT) refer to the terms negotiated of the ABSA, covering the scope of authorised use, restrictions on third-party transfer, intellectual property arrangements, and the type and distribution of benefits.The CBD Secretariat has published voluntary Model Contractual Clauses to guide negotiations, though their use is optional.

The monetary benefits usually include lump sum payments, milestone payments, and royalties. The non-monetary benefits may involve sharing research outcomes, joint ownership of intellectual property rights, transfer of technology, and training. It is more difficult to monitor and evaluate the non-monetary benefits than the monetary ones complicating assessment practice of whether ABSAs deliver benefits in practice or not.

Provisions for compliance and dispute settlement stipulate the applicable law, the dispute resolution mechanism, and procedures to establish the legal right to access through an internationally recognized certificate of compliance filed with the ABS Clearing-House. In the case of any violation of the ABSA, remedies provided in the national legislation can range from termination of the agreement, damage compensation, to penalties. For example- In India this can be seen under Section 55 of the Biological Diversity Act, 2002.

== Implementation ==
National legislation

The Nagoya Protocol is a framework instrument established via national laws that differ among countries. The Indian Biological Diversity Act, 2002 necessitates the prior approval from National Biodiversity Authority prior to accessing biological resources or associated traditional knowledge of India. Benefit sharing terms are generally described as a condition of approval. In a ruling upheld till 2024-2025, the Uttarakhand High Court stated that in accordance with this provision, both foreign as well as domestic organizations should comply with the rules and pay benefit sharing fees for using a medicinal herb unlawfully. In the EU, Regulation (EU) No. 511/2014 obliges the users of genetic resources in EU to observe due diligence while verifying the validity of ABSA and legislation of the country where the genetic resource was obtained no matter where ABSA takes place.

The 2024 WIPO Agreement on Intellectual Property, Genetic Resources and Associated Traditional Knowledge has its own provisions requiring the patenting of inventions with the use of genetic resources or related traditional knowledge. Oguamanam, who consulted the WIPO Secretariat before concluding the treaty, asserts that the treaty's aim is to eliminate biopiracy by enhancing the compatibility between ABS and patenting regimes; however, he and other scholars admit that there are major concerns regarding the relationship between the treaty and the Nagoya Protocol as well as the obligations imposed by the requirements.

Indigenous peoples and traditional knowledge

Under the Nagoya Protocol no access can be gained to any kind of traditional knowledge regarding the genetic resources held by Indigenous peoples or local communities unless permission is granted by those communities with all necessary conditions set forth in their regulations.This raises the problem regarding the validity of organizations ruling over knowledge of the community because traditional systems of governance may not correspond to a legal framework imposed by national ABS legislation.Additionally, national authorities are granted too much power when making decisions on who is entitled to be considered rights-holder. Solutions to this issue that are suggested by certain legislative frameworks work through transferring benefit-sharing payments to some sort of statutory trust and outcome i.e. through compensating communities but avoiding approach of payment to individual rights holders.

Marine genetic resources

Since the CBD and the Nagoya Protocol only pertain to the national jurisdiction, marine genetic resources obtained from the high seas fall outside the applicable benefit-sharing regime. A number of ideas put forward to possibly help in the development of the necessary treaty involved a requirement that access be conditional on revealing the collected samples and data to the public.The BBNJ Agreement was agreed on without vote on June 19, 2023, and was ratified for the sixtieth time and came into effect on January 17, 2026. The second part of the Agreement specifies certain benefit-sharing responsibilities for the marine genetic resources obtained outside the national jurisdiction, which combine the monetary benefit-sharing applicable to commercial activities and the non-monetary benefit-sharing types, including building capabilities, covering also digital sequence information. The major difference between the Agreement and the Nagoya Protocol is that unlike the latter, the Agreement does not require the disclosure of the origins of marine genetic resources used for research or made into products.

Digital sequence information

Digital sequence information, or DSI, refers to genetic sequence data that can be utilized in research without the need for biological material, thereby making it immune to the bilateral model of access and benefit sharing (ABS), which is based on the concept of physical access to resources. The challenge of applying ABS norms to DSI arises from the fact that open sharing of data generated through DSI became the standard in biological research many years ago. Expanding the access and benefit-sharing regulation to DSI can bring access restrictions that it was supposed to avoid. During COP16 of the Conference of the Parties to the Convention of Biological Diversity, which took place in Cali from 2024 to 2025, a multilateral mechanism for ABS of DSI was adopted, including the establishment of the Cali Fund, which collects contributions from companies benefiting from DSI and allocates half of the fund’s resources to the needs indicated by Indigenous peoples and local communities. Non-commercial bodies such as online databases and universities are not requested to contribute financially but have to share non-monetary benefits.

== Challenges ==
There have been some challenges identified in terms of the implementation of ABS agreements.

Biopiracy is defined as the unauthorized utilization of genetic resources or traditional knowledge without compensating the people who originated these resources. In this case, patents for products derived from such resources are normally issued. Different cases of patents granted for the knowledge already possessed by native populations have occurred.

Furthermore, it is difficult to monitor compliance once genetic materials are distributed among several third parties. In addition, the compliance provisions of the Nagoya Protocol cannot effectively regulate the situation with DSI, which is the data obtained before the entry into force of the Nagoya Protocol.

Lastly, the debate over DSI deals with the issue of whether or not the concept of benefit-sharing should be applicable in the cases when people can access the data free of charge and without the transfer of any materials. The balancing of research and benefit-sharing has created difficulties for the scientific sector. The high costs of ABS compliance have been identified as barriers to biodiversity research. This point has influenced the COP16 DSI decision exempting non-commercial research from contribution obligations.

Differences between the developed and the developing countries still shape negotiations. Generally speaking, biodiversity-surplus developing countries have advocated for stronger and enforceable benefit-sharing obligations while several developed countries with big genetic resource users have usually supported narrower obligations along with more legal certainty for the investors. A 2024 study conducted on stakeholders in Brazil has uncovered that despite the fact that ABS implementation continues to attract criticism, the specific biopiracy-centered framing is decreasing in favor of a focus on disputes aimed at institutional design and implementation.
