= Intergovernmental Committee on Intellectual Property and Genetic Resources, Traditional Knowledge and Folklore =

Negotiating forum

Intergovernmental Committee on Intellectual Property and Genetic Resources, Traditional Knowledge and Folklore (IGC)
- Date: 2001–present
- Venue: WIPO headquarters
- Location: Geneva
- Also known as: IGC, IGC-GRTKF
- Type: Intergovernmental Committee
- Theme: Intellectual property, indigenous peoples, traditional knowledge, traditional cultural expressions, genetic resources, biopiracy, peasants' rights, plant breeders' rights, plant genetic resources
- Organized by: WIPO
- Outcome: Treaty or treaties.
- Website: IGC website

The Intergovernmental Committee on Intellectual Property and Genetic Resources, Traditional Knowledge and Folklore (IGC, or IGC-GRTKF) is in charge of negotiating one or several international legal instruments to protect traditional knowledge, traditional cultural expressions, and genetic resources in relation with intellectual property, thus bridging existing gaps in international law. The IGC is convened in Geneva by the World Intellectual Property Organization (WIPO), and has been meeting regularly since 2001.

Based in part of WIPO IGC's work, the WIPO GRATK Treaty on intellectual property, genetic resources, and associated traditional knowledge was adopted in May 2024.

== Work ==
The IGC is an intergovernmental forum in which Member States negotiate. How they do so is framed by the WIPO’s Rules of Procedure, the IGC’s own Rules of Procedure, the IGC’s biennial mandates agreed by the WIPO General Assembly and agreed working methodologies for each session.

The IGC meets several times a year, in Geneva. Under the current mandate (as of 2026), it will meet three times in 2026 and 2027, with each session lasting eight days. The IGC considers working and information documents. The Traditional Knowledge Division of WIPO serves as the IGC's Secretariat. Traditional knowledge is regularly shortened to "TK" and traditional cultural expressions to "TCEs".

Many representatives of accredited observers take part in the IGC, representing some 400 non-governmental organizations. The participation of the accredited representatives of Indigenous and local communities is especially important. The WIPO Voluntary Fund funds the accredited representatives of Indigenous and local communities. The Indigenous Panels are not formally part of the sessions but they provide very valuable empirical information.

Many valuable documents have been published as part of the IGC’s work since it first met in 2001.

The IGC has also developed draft international legal instruments on traditional knowledge and traditional cultural expressions.

== History and mandate ==
The IGC was established in 2000 and it first met in 2001 during the General Assembly of WIPO, which reviews, updates, and extends the mandate of the IGC every two years at the Assembly's meetings.

The IGC had a first diplomatic crisis in 2003, as "the enormity of its task was becoming clearer, as was the gulf in expectations among states as to the IGC's overall purpose and anticipated outcomes." In 2009, the WIPO Assembly "agreed on a much-strengthened mandate" for the IGC, asking it to draft a legal instrument towards the convening of a Diplomatic Conference to adopt one or several treaties.

Since 2010, the mandate of the IGC has remained mostly unchanged: to conclude a consensual text which would bridge the gaps between the numerous existing international legal instruments provide some, but insufficient protection on either traditional knowledge, traditional cultural expressions, or genetic resources (UNDRIP, Convention on Biological Diversity, Nagoya Protocol, FAO plant treaty, UNESCO conventions on culture and intangible heritage, etc.), none of which include explicit protections for indigenous peoples and local communities.

IGC's negotiations were suspended in 2020 because of the pandemic of Severe acute respiratory syndrome coronavirus 2, resuming in 2022. That same year, the IGC agreed to move on to the next steps of treaty negotiation, and WIPO agreed to convene a Diplomatic Conference by 2024 to consider the draft treaty on genetic resources and associated traditional knowledge that the Committee had been working on.

== Negotiation of New Treaties ==
=== WIPO Treaty on Intellectual Property, Genetic Resources and Associated Traditional Knowledge (GRATK) ===
Between 13 and 24 May 2024, WIPO convened a Diplomatic Conference in Geneva, Switzerland. During the Conference, delegates finalized the text of the WIPO Treaty on Intellectual Property, Genetic Resources and Associated Traditional Knowledge (often referred to by its acronym "GRATK") which was adopted in the night of Thursday 23 to Friday 24 May 2024, and opened for signature 24 May in the afternoon, at the WIPO headquarter in Geneva. According to WIPO,

This is the first WIPO Treaty to address the interface between intellectual property, genetic resources and traditional knowledge and the first WIPO Treaty to include provisions specifically for Indigenous Peoples as well as local communities. The Treaty, once it enters into force with 15 contracting parties, will establish in international law a new disclosure requirement for patent applicants whose inventions are based on genetic resources and/or associated traditional knowledge.

=== Future work: Traditional Knowledge and Traditional Cultural Expressions ===
Under its carefully-worded current mandate, the IGC has the objective of finalizing an agreement on an international legal instrument(s) relating to Traditional Knowledge and Traditional Cultural Expressions (folklore) which will ensure the balanced and effective protection of TK and TCEs.

The IGC is also continuing to discuss but not conduct normative work intellectual property issues concerning genetic resources.

The protection of TK and TCEs raises multiple complex policy issues on which views are divided. In general, Indigenous Peoples, local communities and developing countries, argue for a single new binding international instrument that provides enforceable rights in TK and TCEs. On the other hand, developed countries argue for a softer, measures-based approach and for TK and TCEs to be addressed in two separate non-binding instruments. The negotiations in the IGC are complex and the nature and content of future outcomes are uncertain.
