= Indigenous Caucus =

The expression Indigenous Caucus (or Caucus of Indigenous Peoples) refers to informal groups of Indigenous peoples representatives with ad hoc rules of engagement in certain United Nations and other intergovernmental fora.

== World Intellectual Property Organization ==
An Indigenous Caucus participates as observer to the World Intellectual Property Organization (WIPO), particularly its Intergovernmental Committee on Intellectual Property and Genetic Resources, Traditional Knowledge and Folklore (IGC).

=== Modalities ===
==== WIPO Intergovernmental Committee (IGC) ====
Indigenous Peoples participate in the Intergovernmental Committee on Intellectual Property and Genetic Resources, Traditional Knowledge and Folklore as observers for their respective organizations, but also collectively through the informal Indigenous Caucus, "averaging around 25 to 30 people per session."

According to WIPO IGC's Practical Guide for Participants:

Upon invitation of the Chairperson of the WIPO Indigenous Caucus, accredited observers who represent indigenous and local communities meet at the Indigenous Consultative Forum in order to prepare for the IGC on the day preceding its session. A meeting room is made available by WIPO for that purpose. Any accredited observer who represents indigenous and local communities and who wishes to attend the Consultative Forum is requested to advise the WIPO Secretariat in advance in order to be granted a badge at his or her arrival at the WIPO premises.

==== 2024 Diplomatic Conference ====
The Indigenous Caucus also participated in the Diplomatic Conference on Intellectual Property, Genetic Resources and Associated Traditional Knowledge which concluded the GRATK Treaty in May 2024 in Geneva, Switzerland.

During the Conference, the Caucus served as a coordinating forum, enabling its participants with "pivotal roles in liaising with their respective country delegations and others they could connect with." In addition, in the middle of the Diplomatic Conference, "a rotating member of the Indigenous Caucus" was allowed to participate in the reduced negotiating group, where other participants were representatives of WIPO's regional country groups. As a participant to the Caucus related during the Diplomatic Conference:

The process gets truncated from now on with a much smaller group of representatives, including a rotating member of the Indigenous Caucus, participating in informal negotiations before wording is brought back to the two committees and then to a legal drafting group and into the final plenary session by Friday [24 May].

== United Nations Forum on Business and Human Rights ==
The United Nations Forum on Business and Human Rights (UNFBHR) also has a Caucus of Indigenous Peoples.
