= High seas fisheries management =

High seas fisheries management refers to the governance and regulation of fishing activities in areas beyond national jurisdiction, often referred to as the 'high seas'.^{1} The 1982 United Nations Convention on the Law of the Sea (UNCLOS) and the 1995 United Nations Fish Stock Agreement (UNFSA) provide the international legal framework for the regulation of fishing activities in areas beyond national jurisdiction. The United Nations Fish Stock Agreement delegates responsibility for conservation and management of fish stocks to regional fisheries management organizations (RFMOs) each governing a geographical area of the high seas.

Traditionally, most regional fisheries management organizations have focused their conservation and management efforts on sustainably managing harvested fish species to produce the maximum sustainable yield. As pressure on marine ecosystems is rising, and fishing is widely recognized as the main threat to biodiversity in areas beyond national jurisdiction, expectations of the need for RFMOs to integrate a precautionary and ecosystem-based management approach have increased. Some scholars recognize that RFMOs have made vast improvements in adopting conservation measures reflecting the concern for the marine environment and biodiversity. Others find that the practices of RFMOs leave significant governance gaps for biodiversity in areas beyond national jurisdiction.

The negotiations for a new agreement under UNCLOS on the conservation and sustainable use of marine biological diversity of areas beyond national jurisdiction (commonly referred to as the 'BBNJ Treaty' or 'Treaty of the High Seas') have led to a debate among scholars and stakeholders about the performance of RFMOs and future options for the governance of high seas fisheries. Some scholars suggest increasing the capacity of RFMOs in light of recent improvements in biodiversity protection. Others point to the need of vesting a new global body with responsibilities traditionally delegated to RFMOs to enhance conservation of biodiversity in areas beyond national jurisdiction.

== Background for high seas fisheries management ==
Areas beyond the 200 nautical miles limit of Exclusive Economic Zone (EEZs) of coastal states comprise 61% of the world's oceans. Until the 1950s, areas beyond national jurisdiction were inaccessible for fishing activities, but advancements in the development of fishing technology (e.g., sonars, GPS, freezers) have enabled fishers to exploit the high seas. By 2005, the spatial coverage of global fishing efforts had expanded to include most of the world's oceans. In 2014, data suggested that around 6% of the global fish catch originated from the high seas, and as the world population continues to grow, the demand for fish is on the rise. In 2020, 34,2% of all fished species were being overfished.

The risks of depletion and overexploitation of fish stocks have been concerns for decades. In 2006, unsustainable fishing, unregulated fishing and destructive fishing practices were acknowledged by states in the working group preceding the negotiations of the BBNJ Treaty as the greatest threat to biodiversity in areas beyond national jurisdiction. Besides from the negative ecological impacts on biodiversity and ecosystems, overfishing and depletion of marine resources have negative socioeconomic consequences in terms of food security and jobs for billions of people. The Food and Agriculture Organization of the United Nations (FAO) estimates that overfishing is particularly critical for fisheries resources fished in the high seas.

The fundamental challenge for the sustainable use of resources of the high seas stems from areas beyond national jurisdiction being a 'global commons'. Historically, the high seas have been subjected to the principle of 'freedom of the seas' securing non-appropriation of the high seas and freedom of use for all states. The principle of freedom of the high seas was formalized into international law with the 1982 United Nations Convention on the Law of the Sea (UNCLOS). Freedom of the high seas implies that no state has exclusive rights over the common property resources of the high seas, and no state can prevent other states from exploiting these resources. As a result, the high seas essentially suffer from the tragedy of the commons. Concerns about the threat to marine biodiversity posed by fishing activities have led to the gradual development of a global governance regime for high seas fisheries subjecting the freedom of the high seas to the conditions of international law.

== International legal frameworks for high seas fisheries management ==
The 1982 United Nations Convention on the Law of the Sea (UNCLOS) provides the framework for governance of fishing activities in areas beyond national jurisdiction. As an implementing agreement under UNCLOS, the 1995 United Nations Fish Stock Agreement (UNFSA) sets out the obligations of coastal states and states fishing the high seas in more detail. It also provides regional fisheries management organizations (RFMOs) with a mandate to establish conservation and management measures for their geographical areas of competence. The latest addition to the global ocean governance regime is a new implementing agreement under UNCLOS on the conservation and sustainable use of marine biological diversity of areas beyond national jurisdiction (the 'BBNJ Treaty') for which negotiations were completed in March 2023. Although the BBNJ Treaty does not have a mandate to impose direct controls on fishing activities, scholars expect that the new agreement will affect the current governance regime for high seas fisheries management.

=== United Nations Convention on the Law of the Sea (UNCLOS) ===
The rights and duties of states conducting activities in the high seas, including fishing, are governed by the 1982 United Nations Convention on the Law of the Sea (UNCLOS). UNCLOS recognizes the freedom of all states to engage in fishing in the high seas. This right to fishing is linked to the duty of states to cooperate to adopt measures for the conservation and management of the living resources of the high seas through the establishment of regional fisheries organizations. UNCLOS calls for conservation measures for harvested species and their ecosystems. States are obliged to "maintain or restore populations of harvested species at levels which can produce the maximum sustainable yield" and "take into consideration the effects on species associated with or dependent upon harvested species with a view to maintaining or restoring populations". In addition, UNCLOS provide a general obligation to "protect and preserve the marine environment". The foundation of Regional Fisheries Management Organizations (RFMOs), including their priorities and mandates, can thus be traced to the obligations of states laid down in UNCLOS.

Although UNCLOS obliges states to conserve and sustainably use marine living resources and protect the marine environment, the articles on "Conservation and Management of the Living Resources of the High Seas" are vague and provide limited practical guidance. Due to the vagueness of UNCLOS and a continuing decline in high seas fish stocks, the UN member states decided to negotiate the 1995 United Nations Fish Stock Agreement (UNFSA) for the purpose of improving the implementation of the existing UNCLOS conservation and environmental protection duties.

=== United Nations Fish Stock Agreement (UNFSA) ===
The United Nations Fish Stock Agreement (UNFSA) is an implementing agreement under UNCLOS developed to provide practical means for the implementation of the provisions of UNCLOS. The stated objective of the UNFSA is to "ensure the long-term conservation and sustainable use of straddling fish stocks and highly migratory fish stocks through effective implementation of the relevant provisions of the Convention." 'Straddling stocks' are defined as stocks extending beyond the Exclusive Economic Zone (EEZ) of one or more states into the high seas whereas 'highly migratory stocks' is a specific group of species listed in Annex 1 to UNCLOS, including, for example, tuna species, sailfishes, and oceanic sharks.

The UNFSA places two primary obligations on states in relation to fishing activities in areas beyond national jurisdiction: First, states should control the activities of all fishing vessels flying its flag and, second, states should cooperate within regional fisheries management organizations (RFMOs) which have delegated competence to adopt legally binding measures on their member states. The UNFSA thus empower RFMOs as the primary bodies for high seas fisheries management. In addition, the UNFSA specifies the general structure, functioning and responsibilities of RFMOs.

The inclusion in the UNFSA of the obligation of states to apply a precautionary approach to conservation is characterized in the literature as an important specification of the conservation and management principles of UNCLOS. The precautionary approach involves states erring on the side of caution when scientific information is uncertain, unreliable, or inadequate. The UNFSA also provides the basis for an ecosystem-based approach to fisheries management. It includes substantial requirements to assess the impact of fisheries, other human activities and environmental factors on target species and non-target species as well as on their respective associated and dependent species and their environment.

Although the UNFSA does elaborate on the fundamental principles of UNCLOS, it has been criticized for mainly providing guidance and obligations for sustainable management of fish stocks while remaining vague on how to address marine environmental protection in areas beyond national jurisdiction. Scholars have also pointed to the limitation that UNCLOS and UNFSA do not define the exact scope of biodiversity falling under the mandate of RFMOs: The obligation to assess the impacts of fishing on species belonging to the same ecosystem as fished species remains vague due to the ecological complexity of marine ecosystems.

=== Regional Fisheries Management Organizations (RFMOs) ===
Regional fisheries management organizations (RFMOs) are intergovernmental organizations with a delegated responsibility for fisheries management in areas beyond national jurisdiction. RFMOs have a unique mandate under international law to impose legally binding conservation and management measures (CMMs) within their geographical area of competence. Fishing within the high seas areas of an RFMO is conditional on abiding by its rules.

RFMOs are formed by coastal states and countries fishing in the high seas within a certain geographical area. The organizational structure of RFMOs typically includes a Commission, a Scientific Committee and a Technical and Compliance Committee. The Commission consists of member states, and it is the decision-making body charged with the responsibility of adopting conservation and management measures. The Scientific Committee provides the commission with advice on the status of fish stocks and ecosystems to guide decision-making, and The Technical and Compliance Committee provides advice on effective implementation of conservation and management measures.

RFMOs are divided into general RFMOs managing fish stocks by geographical area and tuna RFMOs managing highly migratory species, including tuna and tuna-like species. Almost all high seas areas outside polar regions are covered by a tuna RFMO. Each RFMO has its own convention agreement describing its specific mandates in relation to sustainable use of fishery resources and marine environmental protection, and they differ in the conservation and management measures taken to fulfill those mandates.

=== Agreement on biodiversity beyond national jurisdiction (BBNJ Treaty) ===
The "BBNJ Treaty", also known as the "Treaty of the High Seas", is an implementing agreement under UNCLOS with the general objective of ensuring the conservation and sustainable use of marine biological diversity of areas beyond national jurisdiction through effective implementation of the relevant provisions of UNCLOS. The UN Members states concluded the negotiations of the agreement on 3 March 2023. The adoption of the agreement is scheduled for 19–20 June 2023, and the agreement will enter into force once it has been ratified by 60 states.

What the new BBNJ Treaty will mean for fisheries management in the high seas remains unclear at this point. A broad consensus exists among UN member states and scholars that fishing is the main threat to marine biodiversity in areas beyond national jurisdiction. However, before the onset of the formal negotiations in 2018, the Preparatory Committee for the development of the new legal instrument decided that fisheries would not be directly included in the agreement. This implies that the new agreement must achieve biodiversity conservation without imposing any direct controls on fishing activities. At the same time, scholars agree that the BBNJ Treaty will likely influence fisheries management in the high seas, for example with regard to decision-making and institutional setup for marine protected areas (MPAs) for which both the BBNJ Treaty and RFMOs have a legal mandate.

The effect of the BBNJ Treaty on the existing high seas fisheries management regime largely depends on how the interrelationship between the new treaty and the existing legal frameworks is defined. The relationship between RFMOs and the BBNJ Treaty was not explicitly determined in the draft text circulated before the expected final round of negotiations. This leaves the institutional interplay between the BBNJ Treaty and RFMOs to be defined by the interpretation of the 'not undermining' principle of the BBNJ Treaty. This principle was established early in the process of developing the BBNJ instrument as it was decided that the new agreement "should not undermine existing relevant legal instruments and frameworks and relevant global, regional and sectoral bodies". The meaning of this provision and the related consequences for fisheries management in the high seas have been a subject for ongoing debates among stakeholders and scholars. Many varying interpretations have been put forward, including, for example, the understanding that fisheries management and fish should not form part of the agreement at all or the competing perspective that it should be interpreted in a way that allows the new BBNJ Treaty to improve upon the status quo. The actual working relations between the BBNJ Treaty and existing governance structures remain to be established.

== Conservation and management measures (CMMs) ==
Regional fisheries management organizations adopt legally binding conservation and management measures (CMMs) for fisheries in the high seas. States are responsible for controlling the activities of vessels flying their flag to ensure compliance with regional conservation and management measures. The specific measures adopted by RFMOs vary with the type of RFMO, its geographical area of competence, and its specific mandates as stated in the convention agreement. Historically, conservation and management measures have focused on management of relevant fish stocks and have recently developed to also include measures specifically aimed at protecting biodiversity and the marine environment. RFMOs publish a yearly overview of all conservation and management measures currently in force within their regional area (see examples of CMM publications in 'External links').

Management of fish stocks typically involves measures to ensure maximum sustainable yield of target species. RFMOs develop harvest strategies for key fisheries and implement measures to achieve target reference points, for example by limiting the annual number of vessels fishing a particular fish stock and establishing annual catch limits and report schemes.

Biodiversity and environmental protection measures focus on mitigation of bycatch, for example by regulating or banning specific types of fishing gear such as gill nets, large-scale drift nets and longlines. Measures addressing threats to marine environments include area-based management tools and regulation of bottom fishing. Three resolutions adopted by the United Nations General Assembly (UNGA) in the period 2004-2009 repeatedly called for urgent action to prohibit destructive fishing practices and protect vulnerable marine ecosystems (VMEs) against the impacts of bottom fishing. The willingness of the international community to enhance management of deep-sea fishing based on the ecosystem and precautionary approach has been followed up by RFMOs with measures such as scientific research on the impact of deep-sea fishing, prohibition of bottom trawling, no-fishing zones and areas closures for bottom fishing activities.

== Performance of regional fisheries management organizations ==
RFMOs have been widely criticized for being weak and ineffective and for leaving fish stocks in decline. Literature on the performance of RFMOs shows that they are improving over time, for example by implementing a precautionary and ecosystem-based approach with a holistic view on the impacts of fisheries and reversing the decline in certain target species. However, despite the actions taken to improve performance, weak regulation of fishing activities and ineffective enforcement and compliance continue to be a main concern for the conservation of biodiversity and ecosystems in areas beyond national jurisdiction.

=== Areas of improved performance ===
RFMO management actions for highly valuable commercial species have proven effective in reversing biodiversity loss. A recent study of the five tuna RFMOs shows that sustainable management of target species has allowed for the recovery of tunas and billfishes after 58 years of decline in populations. These results highlight the potential in expanding such effective conservation and management measures to other threatened species to halt and reverse broad biodiversity loss in the high seas.

Traditional RFMO mandates and practical measures have focused on sustainable use of fishery resources. The increased focus on ecosystem approaches in international law have furthered expectations for RFMOs to expand their mandate to include management of the wider impacts of fisheries on non-target species and the surrounding ecosystem. In recent years, RFMOs have progressed by modernizing their constitutive agreements to provide clear mandates to adopt measures for the protection of the marine environment. In addition, the conventions often refer to the application of the precautionary approach and the ecosystem-based approach to conservation. Following the modernizations of RFMO mandates, specific measures for the protection of biodiversity and ecosystems have been implemented. Examples include regulations on the use of specific types of fishing gear to minimize bycatch and area-based management tools such as no-fishing zones in areas of vulnerable marine ecosystems (VMEs). At the 2016 UN bottom fishing review, RFMO measures regulating bottom fishing were characterized as significant progress in implementing the resolutions of the United Nations General Assembly calling for urgent action to protect vulnerable marine ecosystems.

=== Governance gaps in high seas fisheries management ===
While conservation forms part of the mandates of nearly all RFMOs, commitment to conservation in practice is lacking. Although RFMOs work hard to adapt their management to the precautionary and ecosystem approach, scholars find that they have not done a good job. In 2013, five RFMOs were not including minimizing impacts on associated and dependent species of non-target species in their mandates, and those same RFMOs were found to be associated with low mean scores for performance in governing bycatch. A study of tuna RFMOs finds that they have only partially implemented an ecosystem-based fisheries management approach. Current management efforts remain focused on target species with moderate progress for bycatch species, yet no measures have been adopted to account for the impacts of fishing on the marine ecosystem, trophic relationships, and food web structures.

Although the implementation of effective management measures has contributed to rebuilding populations of commercially valuable species such as tunas and billfishes, the extinction risk of undermanaged shark species continues to increase. Despite the UNFSA mandate of RFMOs to assess the impacts of fisheries on target species and non-target, associated or dependent species, monitoring and management efforts of RFMOs largely remain focused on species of commercial interest to RFMO member states. This has left a significant governance gap for non-target species not actively managed or assessed by RFMOs, approximately amounting to 95% of fish biodiversity in areas beyond national jurisdiction. This raises a particular problem in relation to the exclusion of fish from the new agreement on biodiversity beyond national jurisdiction as it constrains the ability of the BBNJ Treaty to address this governance gap.

In addition to the gaps in substantial measures adopted by RFMOs, scholars point to the lack of effective flag state control over fishing vessels in areas beyond national jurisdiction as a serious problem for implementation and enforcement of existing measures.

== The politics of high seas fisheries management ==
The performance of regional fisheries management organizations is shaped by the perspectives and decisions made by their member states. RFMOs are formed by states with various fishing interests ranging from economic interests to conservationist approaches to fishery management. As decision-making processes in RFMO Commissions are generally based on consensus or majority voting, lack of political will of some member states tends to result in weak and inefficient conservation and management measures reflecting the lowest common denominator agreement. For example, RFMO Commissions have delayed the implementation of bottom fisheries closures by requesting further information on the state of the marine ecosystem before adopting closures, which is inconsistent with the precautionary approach urging states to act on suspicion of negative impacts of fishing activities. Other studies find that strong fishing interests of leading member states in the RFMO governing the South Ocean (CCAMLR) have contributed significantly to the opposition against establishing marine protected areas in the Southern Ocean. Conservation measures of CCAMLR are generally weighted towards fishing interests with approximately 76% being focused on fisheries management against 14% focusing on the protection of species, habitats, and ecosystems. Scholars have also argued that the implementation of effective bycatch measures is significantly depending on the political will of RFMO members to prioritize long-term gains such as food security and poverty alleviation over short-term reductions in the economic profitability of target species. In the words of scholars, member states blocking progress pose a risk to RFMO measures and the whole ecosystem.

Fishing has been excluded from the BBNJ Treaty due to the provision that the agreement "should not undermine" existing legal instruments and bodies. This is advantageous for states with strong regional interests as it preserves their political power in RFMOs. Vested state interests in the regional governance system for high seas fisheries management have been identified during the negotiations for the new legal instrument. Some UN member states have argued for the preservation and expansion of the functions of RFMOs at the expense of a global governance body in which states with strong regional fishing interests would become less prominent members.

== Avenues for enhanced fisheries management in the high seas ==
The literature offers various options for improved performance within the existing governance structures. RFMOs could learn from each other and adopt each other's examples of best practice. Scholars highlight best practice example on how to enhance the decision-making process of RFMOs, effectively implement the precautionary and ecosystem-based approach, improve scientific data collection and analysis, and enhance combatting of illegal, unreported, and unregulated (IUU) fishing. Recent collaboration efforts both between RFMOs and with other sectoral bodies have aimed to establish more holistic environmental protection regimes by coordinating action and avoiding conflicting management decisions. Scholars highlight such cooperation efforts as a potential avenue for improved conservation, especially with regard to establishing marine protected areas in the high seas.

Scholars also urge RFMOs to speed up their progress in applying sustainable management practices. Scholars finding that effective management measures have contributed to reversing the biodiversity loss curve for certain target species argue that the decline in other species should be halted by implementing similar measures for them. In addition, the focus of RFMO member states could be returned from political discussions to environmental protection by following advice from scientific bodies of RFMOs more closely and in a timely manner.

Another avenue for enhanced performance related to conservation of biodiversity and ecosystems in the high seas involves establishing working relationships between the existing governance structures and the new treaty for biodiversity beyond national jurisdiction. Scholars argue that the BBNJ Treaty has the potential to strengthen and complement regional fisheries management organizations. The literature broadly identies three possible approaches to the future institutional interplay, commonly referred to as the regional, hybrid and global approach. Recognizing the improvements made by RFMOs in relation to sustainable management of fish stocks and their surrounding environment, scholars of the regional approach argue that protecting the existing mandates of RFMOs and focusing on their efforts to improve environmental protection will allow for more effective and tailored conservation than decision-making and implementation at a global level. Moving decision-making to a global level would make it even harder to reach agreement on binding conservation and management measures. In relation to the hybrid approach, scholars suggest that the BBNJ Treaty could vest RFMOs with decision-making powers and increase their capacity as the primary bodies for implementation of area-based management tools in areas beyond national jurisdiction. Finally, a global approach involves the creation of a global decision-making body, a scientific body, and a secretariat to lead the efforts forwards establishing a comprehensive network of marine protected areas in the high seas. Scholars pursuing the potential of a regional approach argue that such a new global system undermines the existing mandates of RFMOs, a concern which has also been raised by the Food and Agriculture Organization of the United Nations (FAO).

By mid-2023, with the implementation of the BBNJ Treaty still lying ahead, the effect of the new legal instrument governing biodiversity in areas beyond national jurisdiction on high seas fisheries management remains a question for future research.

== Notes ==
^1'Areas beyond national jurisdiction' legally refers to the 'High Seas', including waters beyond the Exclusive Economic Zones (EEZ) (UNCLOS, Part VII, article 86), and the 'Area', including the seabed, the ocean floor and subsoil thereof beyond national jurisdiction (UNCLOS, Part I, article 1).
