= Bermuda Principles =

Theory about the release of genetic sequence data

The Bermuda Principles is an agreement setting out rules for the rapid and public release of DNA sequence data. The Human Genome Project, a multinational effort to sequence the human genome, generated vast quantities of data about the genetic make-up of humans and other organisms. At a 1996 summit in Bermuda, leaders of the scientific community agreed on a groundbreaking set of principles requiring that all DNA sequence data be released in publicly accessible databases within twenty-four hours after generation. These "Bermuda Principles" (also known as the "Bermuda Accord") contravened the typical practice in the sciences of making experimental data available only after publication. These principles represent a significant achievement of private ordering in shaping the practices of an entire industry and have established rapid pre-publication data release as the norm in genomics and other fields.

The three principles retained originally were:

- Automatic release of sequence assemblies larger than 1 kb (preferably within 24 hours).
- Immediate publication of finished annotated sequences.
- Aim to make the entire sequence freely available in the public domain for both research and development in order to maximise benefits to society.

== See also ==
- Fort Lauderdale Agreement
- Human Genome Project
- John E. Sulston
- Wellcome Trust
- Nagoya Protocol

== Sources ==
- John E. Sulston: Heritage of Humanity, Le Monde diplomatique, Dec. 2002
- Policies on Release of Human Genomic Sequence Data 2003
- Jorge L. Contreras, "Bermuda's Legacy: Policy, Patents and the Design of the Genome Commons", Minnesota Journal of Law, Science & Technology, Vol. 12, p. 61, 2011
