= Fort Lauderdale Agreement =

The Fort Lauderdale Agreement was a public declaration of scientists and professionals in biomedicine supporting the free and unrestricted use of genome sequencing data by the scientific community before those data are used for publication. The Agreement was the main outcome of a meeting in Fort Lauderdale, Florida, organized by the Wellcome Trust in 2003 and involved about 40 individuals. The Agreement's main outcome was for a shared system of responsibility among funding agencies, resource producers, and resource users to maintain and expand a community resource of genomic data. The tenets of the Fort Lauderdale Agreement were adopted by the relevant funding agencies, including the National Institute of Health.

Along with the Bermuda Principles, the Agreement is considered to be a founding document of open-access publishing in biomedicine, and is argued to have influenced subsequent agreements for data sharing and open access models.
