= Digital sequence information =

Genetic data and other related data

Digital sequence information (DSI) is a placeholder term used in international policy fora, particularly the Convention on Biological Diversity (CBD), to refer to data derived from dematerialized genetic resources (GR).

== Definition ==
The 2018 Ad Hoc Technical Expert Group on DSI reached consensus that the term was "not appropriate". Nevertheless, the term is generally agreed to include nucleic acid sequence data, and may be construed to include other data types derived from or linked to dematerialized genetic resources, including, for example, protein sequence data. The appropriateness and meaning of this term remain controversial as evidenced by its continued placeholder status, post the 15th Conference of the Parties to the CBD. DSI is crucial to research in a wide range of contexts, including public health, medicine, biodiversity, plant and animal breeding, and evolution research.

== Policy environment ==
=== Convention on Biological Diversity & Nagoya protocol ===
The Nagoya Protocol, a component of the Convention on Biological Diversity, establishes a right for countries to regulate, and to share in benefits derived from, their nation's genetic resources by arranging Access and Benefit Sharing Agreements with users. Academic researchers, however, generally share DSI freely and openly online, following a set of principles that align with the open science movement. Open sharing of DSI is recognized to have broad benefits, and open science is a major and growing focus of international science policy. This creates a perceived conflict with benefit sharing obligations, as individuals can access and use these open data without entering into benefit-sharing agreements.

Parties to the Convention on Biological Diversity have considered a range of policy options that strike different balances between these two important international policy goals. At COP 15 (2022), parties agreed to establish a multilateral mechanism for benefit-sharing from the use of DSI. The key feature of the multilateral framework is that access is decoupled from benefit-sharing, preventing disruption of biodiversity research. At COP 16 (2024), parties agreed to implement this by establishing a fund to which commercial users of DSI would be expected to contribute a percent of their revenue (see COP 16 below).

=== GRATK Treaty ===
In May 2024, a WIPO Diplomatic Conference concluded the International Treaty on Intellectual Property, Genetic Resources and Associated Traditional Knowledge (GRATK), which mandates disclosure requirements for patents based on genetic resources (GR).

Some observers to the negotiations claim that, under the final wording of the treaty, the disclosure requirements apply to patents based on DSI, as long as the DSI was necessary to the patented invention, and/or the invention depends on the specific properties of the DSI:

The draft versions of the Treaty previously contemplated mentions of the qualifier "direct" in the trigger. Drafts also contemplated mentions of the qualifier "material," both in the trigger itself and in its definition. These qualifiers were deleted by the drafters, leaving only the criteria of necessity and dependence on specific properties. If a GR was necessary to create a claimed invention, and the invention depends on such GR, even if indirectly and/or immaterially, it falls under the scope of this Treaty. A claimed invention relying on DSI obtained from a GR will therefore have to disclose the GR from which the DSI derives.

=== Convention on Biological Diversity COP16 ===
At the 2024 United Nations Biodiversity Conference of the Parties to the CBD in Cali (COP16), a decision was made to establish the Cali Fund, to which industries that use DSI, like pharma, cosmetics, nutraceuticals, and biotech, will be expected to contribute a small portion of their profits to support global biodiversity conservation. A methodology for implementation, including thresholds and contribution rates, is scheduled to be agreed at the seventeenth conference of the parties to the CBD. The fund will support biodiversity protection and reward Indigenous and forest communities, with 50% allocated to local and Indigenous groups.

=== Other treaties ===
DSI is also an important concept in other international legally binding instruments with access and benefit-sharing obligations, including:

- FAO's International Treaty on Plant Genetic Resources for Food and Agriculture (Plant Treaty, or Seed Treaty),
- Pandemic Influenza Preparedness Framework,
- Antarctic Treaty System
- Biodiversity Beyond National Jurisdiction (BBNJ Treaty, or High Seas Treaty), a component of the United Nations Convention on the Law of the Sea.
