= United Nations Fish Stocks Agreement =

United Nations treaty

- Signed: 4 December 1995 – 4 December 1996
- Location: New York City, United States
- Effective: 11 December 2001
- Condition: 93 ratifications
- Signatories: 59
- Parties: 95

The Agreement for the Implementation of the Provisions of the United Nations Convention on the Law of the Sea Relating to the Conservation and Management of Straddling Fish Stocks and Highly Migratory Fish Stocks, otherwise known as the UN Fish Stocks Agreement (UNFSA), is a multilateral treaty created by the United Nations to enhance the cooperative management of fisheries resources that require international cooperation because they span wide areas and are of economic and environmental concern to a number of nations. The UNFSA builds on and implements specific provisions to the United Nations Convention on the Law of the Sea (UNCLOS), acting as a supplementary treaty.

As of June 2026, the treaty had been ratified by 95 parties, which includes 94 states and the European Union. The objective of UNFSA is to ensure the long-term conservation and sustainable use of fish that are straddling or highly migratory. These fish stocks are present across national borders or outside the Exclusive Economic Zones (EEZs) as drawn by UNCLOS, therefore necessitating international cooperation.

Straddling fish stocks are those which can be found both within a given nation’s jurisdiction and in the adjacent high seas. Examples of straddling fish stocks include cod, squid, and halibut. Scholars have noted that straddling stocks can be vulnerable to overexploitation due to difficulties in coordinating management across jurisdictions.

Highly migratory fish stocks travel longer distances regularly through international boundaries and EEZs. Examples of highly migratory fish stocks include tuna and swordfish.

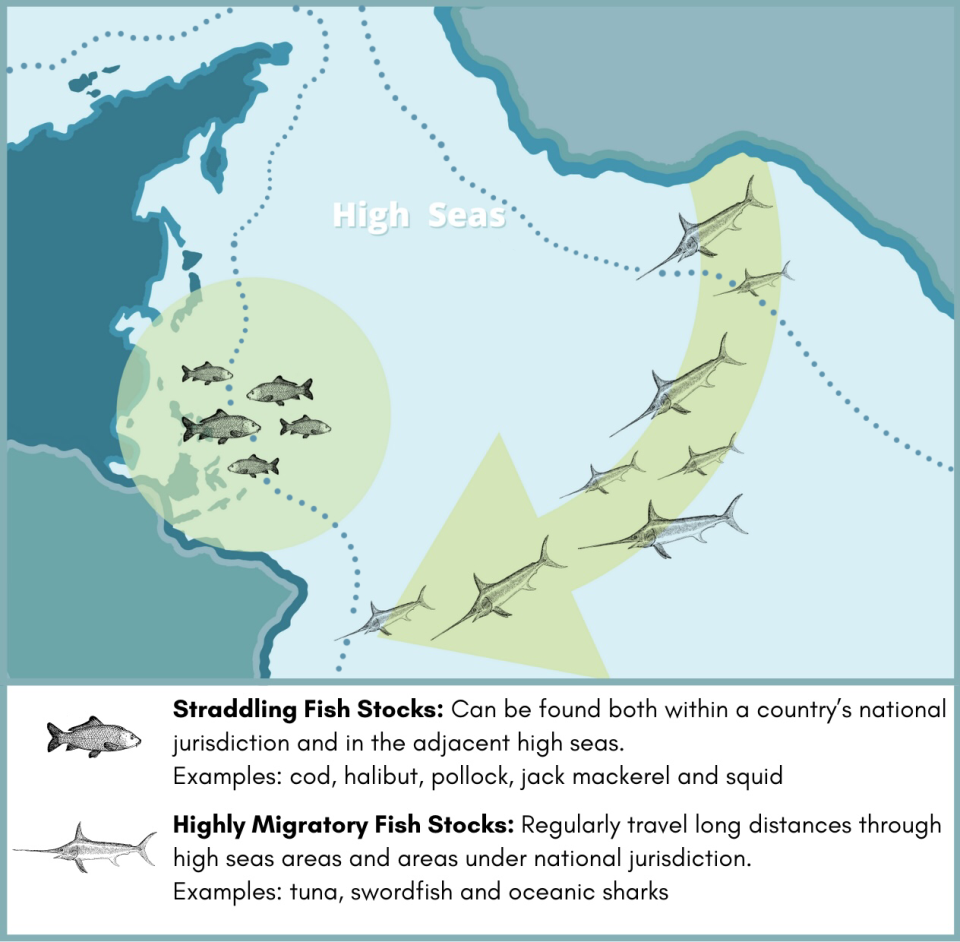
Highly migratory and straddling fish stocks

== Background ==
The United Nations Convention on the Law of the Sea (UNCLOS) is a legally binding international treaty that delineates the rights and responsibilities of nations in their use and governance of the world’s oceans. Grounded in the principle that all ocean-related issues are inherently interconnected, UNCLOS seeks to address them through a comprehensive legal framework. UNCLOS was opened for signature on December 10, 1982, in Jamaica and entered into force on November 16, 1994, twelve months after the sixtieth ratification. As of November 2025, the convention has 157 signatories and 171 parties.

The original UNCLOS regime has been expanded to include three additional elements, one of which being the UNFSA. The Agreement was adopted in 1995, and came into force in 2001.The Division for Ocean Affairs and the Law of the Sea (DOALOS), operating within the United Nations Office of Legal Affairs, serves as the secretariat for UNCLOS. It provides member states with information, guidance, and technical assistance to promote a deeper understanding of the Convention and to ensure its consistent and effective implementation.

Prior to the adoption of UNFSA, no dedicated global agreement focused specifically on straddling and highly migratory fish stocks.

== Key Provisions ==
The UN Fish Stocks Agreement is concerned with the conservation and management of these fish stocks as if they were unregulated, it would result in various negative externalities such as exploitation and inefficient allocation. UNFSA is meant to be ‘interpreted and applied in the context’ of UNCLOS, and it requires states to cooperate directly and/or through regional fisheries management organizations in establishing conservation and management measures, applying the precautionary and ecosystem approaches, and using the best available scientific evidence. Some key UNFSA provisions are explained in the following sections:

Cooperation through Regional Fisheries Management Organizations (RFMOs) – Articles 7 & 8: States are required to cooperate directly or through regional fisheries management organizations to establish conservation and management measures for straddling and highly migratory stocks, ensuring measures are compatible across jurisdictions.

Precautionary Approach – Article 6: States must apply the precautionary approach, meaning conservation measures should not be postponed due to scientific uncertainty, to avoid overfishing and protect ecosystems.

Science-Based Management – Article 5 & 7: Decisions must be based on the best available scientific evidence, including stock assessments and ecosystem considerations, to ensure sustainable use.

Flag State Responsibilities – Articles 18 & 21: Flag states must ensure that vessels flying their flag comply with conservation measures, including licensing, monitoring, inspection, and reporting obligations.

Port State Measures – Articles 22 & 23: States must exercise control over foreign fishing vessels using their ports, including inspections and prohibiting landings from non-compliant vessels, to prevent illegal, unreported, and unregulated fishing (IUU).

Dispute Settlement and Compliance – Articles 30–33: The Agreement provides mechanisms for consultations and, if necessary, arbitration or judicial settlement to resolve disputes between states regarding interpretation or application of the Agreement.

Bueger and Mallin (2023) characterize a broader “ocean revolution”- a shift in intellectual, political, and policy thinking about the oceans. This revolution reflects new awareness of crises at sea: interstate tensions, piracy, overfishing, pollution, deoxygenation and climate change. Burger and Mallin identify four distinct “blue paradigms” that are central to how ocean politics is now framed: maritime security, blue economy, ocean health, and blue justice. The 1995 UN Fish Stocks Agreement (UNFSA) is one of the key legal instruments developed to improve the conservation and management of straddling and highly migratory fish stocks beyond national jurisdiction. Its provisions on cooperation through regional fisheries management organizations, conservation duties, and compliance and enforcement mechanisms align with several elements described as characteristics of the contemporary “ocean revolution,” including concerns with security, economic use, environmental protection, and equity.

== Effectiveness ==
The effectiveness of the UN Fish Stocks Agreement as both a political instrument and a framework for states to implement eco-conscious approaches to fish stock management is subject to much debate among scholars and political actors. Discussion of the efficacy of UNFSA is typically associated with that of UNCLOS, as the functions of the two are highly interlinked. UNCLOS is often analyzed from an environmental and climate change perspective, in articles such as Junshik (2016), Wu and Tiansheng (2025), Mossop (2018), Zeng and Wang (2024), Kittichaisaree (2025), Boyle (2019), and Rafaly (2022). Many of these scholars and researchers argue that UNCLOS and its additions such as UNFSA made significant achievements in making the issue of climate change the essential political item it is today. Spalding and De Ycaza (2020) identify fisheries as one of UNCLOS’s strengths, describing its fisheries governance as “well-established”. As an example, they refer to the 1995 UN Fish Stocks Agreement and UNCLOS’s explicit provisions on fisheries. However, other scholars are specifically critical of UNCLOS’s ability to properly manage problems relating to fisheries. For example, Mossop (2018) contends that UNCLOS falls short in addressing issues of fisheries and biodiversity, primarily focusing on fisheries in economic terms while the development of a comprehensive “ecosystem approach” is still limited. Assessments of UNFSA focus on how its provisions are interpreted and applied by states, courts, and regional organizations in response to ongoing developments in climate impacts, biodiversity conservation, and ecosystem-based fisheries management.

== See also ==
- Fisheries management
- Admiralty law
- United Nations Convention on the Law of the Sea
- Fish stocks
- United Nations
- Flag State
- Fishing
- Fishing Vessel
- Overfishing
- High Seas Treaty
- List of parties to the United Nations Convention on the Law of the Sea
