= Alta Outcome Document =

The Alta Outcome Document was a document of indigenous peoples' recommendations for a high-level plenary meeting of the General Assembly to be called the World Conference on Indigenous Peoples in 2014, produced from the Global Indigenous Preparatory Conference in Alta, Norway on 10–12 June 2013.

300 representatives of indigenous peoples from all of the world's global geo-political regions participated in creating the recommendations and document. There were 600 delegates and observers of the preparatory meeting.

The Sami Parliament of Norway hosted the event. It was drafted through democratic processes, facilitated by a writing group consisting of indigenous peoples' representatives from all global regions. Some questioned whether the document reflected genuine consensus, given the diversity of the world's indigenous peoples.

The ambition of the indigenous peoples involved was to have the document be accepted as an official United Nations document.

Key topics included:

- indigenous peoples' lands, territories, resources, oceans and waters;
- implementation of the rights of indigenous peoples and UN action to support it;
- indigenous peoples' priorities for development with free, prior and informed consent;
- relationship between governments, indigenous peoples and extractive industries regarding participation, access to decision-making and distribution of income.

Indigenous peoples' increasing involvement with UN processes may not be integrated with that of the state governing their ancestral domain. For example, the Indonesian Indigenous Peoples' Alliance of the Archipelago wrote a letter to President Susilo Bambang Yudhoyono regarding Government of Indonesia objections to the UN over 2014 conference plans, which claimed Indonesian indigenous peoples had not been involved.

== See also ==
- Declaration on the Rights of Indigenous Peoples
- Indigenous rights
