= Declaration on the Rights of Indigenous Peoples =

Declaration adopted in 2007 by the United Nations General Assembly

UN General Assembly Resolution 61/295: Approved / States which voted for the resolution; Rejected / States which voted against the resolution; Abstained / States which abstained from voting; Absent / States not present at the vote; Date / 13 September 2007; Code / A/61/295 (Document); Subject / Indigenous rights; Voting Summary / 143 voted for 4 voted against 11 abstained 34 absent; Result / Adopted

The Declaration on the Rights of Indigenous Peoples (UNDRIP or DOTROIP) is a legally non-binding United Nations resolution passed by the General Assembly on September 13, 2007, that delineates and defines the individual and collective rights of Indigenous peoples, including their ownership rights, cultural and ceremonial expression, identity, language, employment, health, education and other issues. Their ownership also extends to the protection of their Indigenous intellectual property. The declaration "emphasizes the rights of Indigenous peoples to maintain and strengthen their own institutions, cultures and traditions, and to pursue their development in keeping with their own needs and aspirations." It "prohibits discrimination against indigenous peoples and promotes their full and effective participation in all matters that concern them, and their right to remain distinct and to pursue their own visions of economic and social development".

The goal of the declaration is to encourage countries to work alongside Indigenous peoples to solve global issues, such as development, multiculturalism, democracy, and decentralization.

On September 13, 2007, the United Nations voted by a vast majority of 143 in favor (4 against, 11 abstained, and 34 absent) of the declaration.

Since 2007, Australia, Canada, New Zealand, and the United States have reversed their positions and now support the declaration. As of February 2020, the United Nations Department of Economic and Social Affairs describes (A/RES/61/295) as "the most comprehensive international instrument on the rights of Indigenous peoples. It establishes a universal framework of minimum standards for the survival, dignity and well-being of the Indigenous peoples of the world and it elaborates on existing human rights standards and fundamental freedoms as they apply to the specific situation of Indigenous peoples."

As a United Nations General Assembly declaration, UNDRIP is not a legally binding instrument under international law. According to a UN press release it does "represent the dynamic development of international legal norms and it reflects the commitment of the UN's member states to move in certain directions"; the UN describes it as setting "an important standard for the treatment of indigenous peoples that will undoubtedly be a significant tool toward eliminating human rights violations against the planet's 370 million indigenous people, and assisting them in combating discrimination and marginalization."

UNDRIP codifies "Indigenous historical grievances, contemporary challenges and socio-economic, political and cultural aspirations" and is the "culmination of generations-long efforts by Indigenous organizations to get international attention, to secure recognition for their aspirations, and to generate support for their political agendas." Ken Coates, a Canada Research Chair and faculty member at the University of Saskatchewan, argues that UNDRIP resonates powerfully with indigenous peoples, while national governments have not yet fully understood its impact.

== History ==
The groundwork toward this declaration began in 1923 and 1925 with the works of Haudenosaunee Chief Deskaheh and Māori religious leader T. W. Ratana, who attempted to bring attention to Canada's and New Zealand's failure to uphold treaties before the League of Nations, the precursor to the United Nations. Issues concerning indigenous peoples on a world scale began to be reevaluated in 1982 with the establishment of the Working Group on Indigenous Populations, formed by the Economic and Social Council (ECOSOC). its goal was to create an overarching document to protect the rights and privileges of indigenous peoples worldwide.

The declaration went through numerous drafts beginning in 1994, after a version had already been recommended by the Vienna Declaration and Programme of Action in 1993, to 2006, when the draft was adopted and its approval by the United Nations General Assembly was recommended by the United Nations Human Rights Council.

On Thursday, September 13, 2007, the United Nations voted by a vast majority of 143 in favor (4 against, 11 abstentions, and 34 absent) to adopt the declaration. In May 2016, Canada officially removed its objector status to UNDRIP, almost a decade after it was adopted by the General Assembly. By that year, Australia, New Zealand, and the United States of America, who had also voted against the declaration, had reversed their positions and expressed support.

== Current applications ==
=== Implementations ===
Canada has processes underway to better recognize and realize in practice the rights of indigenous peoples.

=== Denial of the existence of Indigenous peoples ===
Several states do not recognize Indigenous ethnic minorities within their territories as being indigenous peoples, and simply refer to them as ethnic minorities. Many of these ethnic minorities are marginalized from the majority ethnic population in relative social, economic and political performance measures, and their Indigenous rights are poorly protected. UNDRIP signatories that disregard the intent outlined in UNDRIP articles include the People's Republic of China and the Socialist Republic of Vietnam.

== Purpose ==
Due to the past and ongoing violence and abuse of indigenous individuals and peoples, the UN created this non-legally binding declaration as an aspiration for how indigenous individuals and peoples should be treated.

This declaration is a resolution, meaning it is not a law-bearing document. Indigenous peoples are not considered political nation-states and do not have access to international law protection through the international court of justice. Article 40 states that indigenous peoples have the right to fair procedures for the resolution of conflicts and disputes with countries or other parties. Because indigenous people cannot use the International Court of Justice, UNDRIP has no indication of which judicial power indigenous peoples are to bring disputes to.

The declaration's purpose is not to create new rights, but rather addresses topics such as indigenous reconciliation in regard to restoring and protecting culture, traditions, and indigenous institutions, and the pursuit of self-determined development.

== Content ==
The declaration is structured as a United Nations resolution, with 23 preambular clauses and 46 articles. Most articles include an aspiration for how the State should promote and protect the rights of indigenous people (see Provision for further explanation). Major themes of the articles include:

- Rights of self-determination of indigenous individuals and peoples (articles 1–8; 33–34)
  - The difference is between the individual and people's group
  - Indigenous peoples and individuals have the right not to be subjected to forced assimilation or destruction of their culture.
- Rights of indigenous individuals and people to protect their culture through practices, languages, education, media, and religion, including control of their intellectual property (articles 9–15, 16, 25, and 31)
- Asserts the indigenous peoples' right to own type of governance and to economic development (articles 17–21, 35–37)
- Health rights (articles 23–24)
- Protection of subgroups ex. elderly, women, and children (article 22)
- Land rights from ownership (including reparation, or return of land i.e. article 10) to environmental issues (articles 26–30, and 32)
- Dictates how this document should be understood in future reference (articles 38–46).

=== Provisions ===
The opening and article 2 of the declaration provide that "indigenous peoples are equal to all other peoples" (source). Besides asserting the rights that indigenous individuals and peoples have as other peoples, there are articles (23 of the 46) pointing to how States should interact with the declaration. Most of the articles point to States working in conjunction with the indigenous peoples. Some measures countries are suggested to take are:

- To return land (article 26), ceremonial objects (article 12), and human remains (article 12)
- To place "programmes for monitoring, maintaining, and restoring the health of indigenous peoples" (article 29)
- To protect and uphold the rights of indigenous individuals and peoples (subpoint in many articles; see Declaration)

== Negotiation and adoption ==
UN General Assembly Resolution 61/295
- Date: 13 September 2007
- Code: A/61/295 (Document)
- Subject: Indigenous rights
- Voting summary: 143 voted for; 4 voted against; 11 abstained; 34 absent
- Result: Adopted

The declaration was over 25 years in the making. The idea originated in 1982 when the UN Economic and Social Council (ECOSOC) set up its Working Group on Indigenous Populations (WGIP), established as a result of a study by Special Rapporteur José Ricardo Martínez Cobo on the problem of discrimination faced by indigenous peoples. Tasked with developing human rights standards that would protect indigenous peoples, in 1985 the working group began working on drafting the declaration on the Rights of Indigenous Peoples. The draft was finished in 1993 and was submitted to the Sub-Commission on the Prevention of Discrimination and Protection of Minorities, which gave its approval the following year. During this the International Labour Organization adopted the Indigenous and Tribal Peoples Convention, 1989 (C169).

The draft declaration was then referred to the Commission on Human Rights, which established another working group to examine its terms. Over the following years this working group met on 11 occasions to examine and fine-tune the draft declaration and its provisions. Progress was slow because of certain states' concerns regarding some key provisions of the declaration, such as indigenous peoples' right to self-determination and the control over natural resources existing on indigenous peoples' traditional lands. The final version of the declaration was adopted on June 29, 2006, by the 47-member Human Rights Council (the successor body to the Commission on Human Rights), with 30 member states in favour, 2 against, 12 abstentions, and 3 absentees.

The declaration (document A/61/L.67) was then referred to the General Assembly, which voted on the adoption of the proposal on September 13, 2007, during its 61st regular session.

The vote was as follows:

| Vote | Quantity | Countries |
|---|---|---|
| Approve | 143 | Afghanistan, Albania, Algeria, Andorra, Angola, Antigua and Barbuda, Argentina, Armenia, Austria, Bahamas, Bahrain, Barbados, Belarus, Belgium, Belize, Benin, Bolivia, Bosnia and Herzegovina, Botswana, Brazil, Brunei Darussalam, Bulgaria, Burkina Faso, Cambodia, Cameroon, Cape Verde, Central African Republic, Chile, China, Comoros, Congo, Costa Rica, Croatia, Cuba, Cyprus, Czech Republic, Democratic People's Republic of Korea, Democratic Republic of the Congo, Denmark, Djibouti, Dominica, Dominican Republic, Ecuador, Egypt, El Salvador, Estonia, Finland, France, Gabon, Germany, Ghana, Greece, Guatemala, Guinea, Guyana, Haiti, Honduras, Hungary, Iceland, India, Indonesia, Iran, Iraq, Ireland, Italy, Jamaica, Japan, Jordan, Kazakhstan, Kuwait, Lao People's Democratic Republic, Latvia, Lebanon, Lesotho, Liberia, Libya, Liechtenstein, Lithuania, Luxembourg, Macedonia, Madagascar, Malawi, Malaysia, Maldives, Mali, Malta, Mauritius, Mexico, Micronesia (Federated States of), Moldova, Monaco, Mongolia, Mozambique, Myanmar, Namibia, Nepal, Netherlands, Nicaragua, Niger, Norway, Oman, Pakistan, Panama, Paraguay, Peru, Philippines, Poland, Portugal, Qatar, Republic of Korea, Saint Lucia, Saint Vincent and the Grenadines, San Marino, Saudi Arabia, Senegal, Serbia, Sierra Leone, Singapore, Slovakia, Slovenia, South Africa, Spain, Sri Lanka, Sudan, Suriname, Swaziland, Sweden, Switzerland, Syria, Thailand, Timor-Leste, Trinidad and Tobago, Tunisia, Turkey, United Arab Emirates, United Kingdom, United Republic of Tanzania, Uruguay, Venezuela, Vietnam, Yemen, Zambia, and Zimbabwe |
| Reject | 4 | Australia, Canada, New Zealand, and United States |
| Abstain | 11 | Azerbaijan, Bangladesh, Bhutan, Burundi, Colombia, Georgia, Kenya, Nigeria, Russian Federation, Samoa, and Ukraine |
| Absent | 34 | Chad, Côte d'Ivoire, Equatorial Guinea, Eritrea, Ethiopia, Fiji, Gambia, Grenada, Guinea-Bissau, Israel, Kiribati, Kyrgyzstan, Marshall Islands, Mauritania, Montenegro, Morocco, Nauru, Palau, Papua New Guinea, Romania, Rwanda, Saint Kitts and Nevis, São Tomé and Príncipe, Seychelles, Solomon Islands, Somalia, Tajikistan, Togo, Tonga, Turkmenistan, Tuvalu, Uganda, Uzbekistan, and Vanuatu |

All four member states that voted against have their origins as settler colonies of the British Empire, and have a majority of non-indigenous population. Since then, all four countries have moved to endorse the declaration in some informal way in which it would not actually become binding law pleadable in court. Canada, under a Conservative Party leadership made official public statements against the application of the UNDRIP in Canada.

However, the Liberal Government elected to leadership in 2015, has unequivocally indicated Canada's support for UNDRIP. On December 3, 2020, Bill C-15 was introduced to the House of Commons that would bring Canadian law into alignment with the UN resolution. Bill C-15 passed Canada's senate on June 16, 2021, and received royal assent on June 21, 2021, to become law. In doing so Canada became the first of the four countries that originally voted against the UNDRIP to adopt it into law.

Australian Government interventions have been challenged under its terms without success.

Three abstaining countries, Colombia, Samoa, and Ukraine have since endorsed the document.

== Support and compromises ==
In contrast to the declaration's initial rejection by Australia, Canada, New Zealand and the United States over legal concerns (all four countries later switched their positions to accepting the declaration as a non-legally-binding document), United Nations officials and other world leaders expressed pleasure at its adoption. Secretary-General Ban Ki-moon described it as a "historic moment when UN Member States and indigenous peoples have reconciled with their painful histories and are resolved to move forward together on the path of human rights, justice and development for all." Louise Arbour, a former justice of the Supreme Court of Canada then serving as the UN's High Commissioner for Human Rights, expressed satisfaction at the hard work and perseverance that had finally "borne fruit in the most comprehensive statement to date of indigenous peoples' rights." Similarly, news of the declaration's adoption was greeted with jubilation in Africa and, present at the General Assembly session in New York, Bolivian foreign minister David Choquehuanca said that he hoped the member states that had voted against or abstained would reconsider their refusal to support a document he described as being as important as the Universal Declaration of Human Rights. Bolivia has become the first country to approve the U.N. declaration of indigenous rights. Evo Morales, President of Bolivia, stated, "We are the first country to turn this declaration into a law and that is important, brothers and sisters. We recognize and salute the work of our representatives. But if we were to remember the indigenous fight clearly, many of us who are sensitive would end up crying in remembering the discrimination, the scorn."

Stephen Corry, director of the international indigenous rights organization Survival International, said, "The declaration has been debated for nearly a quarter century. Years which have seen many tribal peoples, such as the Akuntsu and Kanoê in Brazil, decimated and others, such as the Innu in Canada, brought to the edge. Governments that oppose it are shamefully fighting against the human rights of their most vulnerable peoples. Claims they make to support human rights in other areas will be seen as hypocritical."

The Australian Institute of Aboriginal and Torres Strait Islander Studies (AIATSIS) formally acknowledges and upholds the principles of the declaration in both their Collection Access and Use Policy and their Guidelines for Ethical Research in Australian Indigenous Studies.

== Criticism ==
Prior to the adoption of the declaration, and throughout the 62nd session of the General Assembly, a number of countries expressed concern about some key issues, such as self-determination, access to lands, territories and resources and the lack of a clear definition of the term "indigenous". In addition to those intending to vote against the adoption of the declaration, a group of African countries represented by Namibia proposed to defer action, to hold further consultations, and to conclude consideration of the declaration by September 2007. Ultimately, after agreeing on some adjustments to the draft declaration, a vast majority of states recognized that these issues could be addressed by each country at the national level.

=== By opposing countries ===
The four states that voted against continued to express serious reservations about the final text of the declaration as placed before the General Assembly. All four opposing countries later changed their vote in favour of the declaration.

==== Australia ====
The Australian Government opposed the declaration in the General Assembly vote of 2007, but has since endorsed the declaration. Australia's Mal Brough, Minister for Families, Community Services and Indigenous Affairs, referring to the provision regarding the upholding of indigenous peoples' customary legal systems, said that "There should only be one law for all Australians and we should not enshrine in law practices that are not acceptable in the modern world."

Marise Payne, Liberal Party Australian Senate for New South Wales, further elaborated on the Australian government's objections to the declaration in a speech to the Australian Senate:

- Concerns about references to self-determination and their potential to be misconstrued.
- Ignorance of contemporary realities concerning land and resources. "They seem, to many readers, to require the recognition of Indigenous rights to lands which are now lawfully owned by other citizens, both Indigenous and non-Indigenous, and therefore to have some quite significant potential to impact on the rights of third parties."
- Concerns over the extension of indigenous intellectual property rights under the declaration as unnecessary under current international and Australian law.
- The potential abuse of the right under the declaration for indigenous peoples to unqualified consent on matters affecting them, "which implies to some readers that they may then be able to exercise a right of veto over all matters of state, which would include national laws and other administrative measures."
- The exclusivity of indigenous rights over intellectual, real and cultural property, that "does not acknowledge the rights of third parties – in particular, their rights to access Indigenous land and heritage and cultural objects where appropriate under national law." Furthermore, that the declaration "fails to consider the different types of ownership and use that can be accorded to Indigenous people and the rights of third parties to property in that regard."
- Concerns that the declaration places indigenous customary law in a superior position to national law, and that this may "permit the exercise of practices which would not be acceptable across the board", such as customary corporal and capital punishments.

In October 2007 former Australian Prime Minister John Howard pledged to hold a referendum on changing the Australian constitution to recognize Indigenous Australians if re-elected. He said that the distinctiveness of people's identity and their rights to preserve their heritage should be acknowledged.

On April 3, 2009, the Rudd Government formally endorsed the declaration.

==== Canada ====
The Canadian Government said that while it supported the "spirit" of the declaration, it contained elements that were "fundamentally incompatible with Canadian Constitution", which includes both the Charter of Rights and Freedoms and Section 35, which enshrines aboriginal and treaty rights. In particular, the Canadian government had problems with article 19 (which appears to require governments to secure the consent of indigenous peoples regarding matters of general public policy), and articles 26 and 28 (which could allow for the re-opening or repudiation of historically settled land claims).

Former Minister of Indian Affairs and Northern Development, Chuck Strahl, described the document as "unworkable in a Western democracy under a constitutional government." Strahl elaborated, saying "In Canada, you are balancing individual rights vs. collective rights, and (this) document has none of that. By signing on, you default to this document by saying that the only rights in play here are the rights of the First Nations. And, of course, in Canada, that's inconsistent with our constitution." He gave an example: "In Canada you can negotiate on this is because (native rights) don't trump all other rights in the country. You need also to consider the people who have sometimes also lived on those lands for two or three hundred years, and have hunted and fished alongside the First Nations."

The Assembly of First Nations passed a resolution in December 2007 to invite Presidents Hugo Chávez and Evo Morales to Canada to put pressure on the government to sign the Declaration on the Rights of Indigenous Peoples, calling the two heads of state "visionary leaders" and demanding Canada resign its membership on the United Nations Human Rights Council.

On March 3, 2010, in the Speech From the Throne, the Governor General of Canada announced that the government was moving to endorse the declaration. "We are a country with an Aboriginal heritage. A growing number of states have given qualified recognition to the United Nations Declaration on the Rights of Indigenous Peoples. Our Government will take steps to endorse this aspirational document in a manner fully consistent with Canada's Constitution and laws."

On November 12, 2010, Canada officially endorsed the declaration but without changing its position that it was "aspirational".

Anishinabek spiritual leader, Chief William Commanda (1908-3 August 2011) was honoured at the 21st annual week-long First Peoples' Festival held in Montreal from August 2–9, 2011, celebrating Canada's 2010 adoption of the U. N. declaration. AFN Innu representative, Ghislain Picard's tribute praised Grandfather Commanda for his work that was "key not only in the adoption of the U.N. declaration, but in all the work leading up to it throughout the last 25 years."

In 2015, Romeo Saganash (a Cree Member of Parliament for Abitibi—Baie-James—Nunavik—Eeyou) sponsored Private Member's Bill C-641, the "United Nations Declaration on the Rights of Indigenous Peoples Act", which would have required the Canadian government to ensure that the laws of Canada are in harmony with UNDRIP but it was defeated on May 6, 2015.

On July 7, 2015, in an open letter to provincial cabinet members, Premier of Alberta Rachel Notley asked each minister to conduct a review of their policies, programs, and legislation that might require changes based on the principles of the UN declaration.

In December 2015, the Canadian Truth and Reconciliation Commission listed ratifying UNDRIP as one of its national "calls to action" in its final report.

In 2016, Canada officially adopted and promised to implement the declaration fully. Speaking at the United Nations Permanent Forum on Indigenous Issues, Indigenous and Northern Affairs Canada minister Carolyn Bennett announced, "We are now a full supporter of the declaration, without qualification. We intend nothing less than to adopt and implement the declaration in accordance with the Canadian Constitution." Bennett described the declaration as "breathing life into Section 35 [of the Canadian Constitution] and recognizing it as a full box of rights for Indigenous Peoples in Canada." In July 2016, Canadian Justice Minister Jody Wilson-Raybould, a member of a Kwakwaka'wakw First Nation, gave a speech that stated that "adopting the UNDRIP as being Canadian law are unworkable", due to its incompatibility with the Indian Act, the current governing statute.

The federal government pledged on 21 June 2017 to rename its National Aboriginal Day to be consistent with the terminology used by the declaration.

In September 2017, the British Columbia's provincial government announced that it will govern in accordance with the principles outlined in the declaration. On October 24, 2019, it announced that it will amend its legislation to conform to UNDRIP. BC is the first province in Canada to start implementing legislation in accordance with the UNDRIP.

The British Columbia (BC) provincial government was the first Canadian province to start bringing its legislation in alliance with the UNDRIP by implementing the BC Declaration on the Rights of Indigenous People's Act. The ongoing process of implementation is intended to propel reconciliation forward in BC. The provincial government has been working with the Assembly of First Nations, First Nations Summit and Union of British Columbia Indian Chiefs, headed by First Nations Chiefs of BC to employ UNDRIP principles . The legislation was originally put forth by Minister of Indigenous Relations and Reconciliation Scott Fraser, under John Horgan's New Democratic Party government. The Legislative Assembly of British Columbia notes that the purposes the Act are as follows: (a) to affirm the application of the Declaration to the laws of British Columbia; (b) to contribute to the implementation of the Declaration; (c) to support the affirmation of, and develop relationships with, Indigenous governing bodies. As of November 2019, the BC government has committed to putting almost CA$100 million per year aside for First Nation communities, in order for them to invest in their own self-governance and cultural revitalization; the province has also dedicated CA$50 million to invest in First Nations communities language revitalization. Additionally, they have implemented Grand Chief Edward John's recommendations to decrease the number of indigenous children taken from homes and put in care.

On December 3, 2020, Bill C-15, the United Nations Declaration on the Rights of Indigenous Peoples Act, was introduced to the House of Commons by the Minister of Justice David Lametti that would bring Canadian law into alignment with the UN resolution. Bill C-15 passed Canada's senate on June 16, 2021, and received royal assent on June 21, 2021 to become law. In doing so Canada became the first of the four countries with histories as settler colonies of the British empire with majority non-indigenous populations that originally voted against to now adopt UNDRIP.

==== New Zealand ====
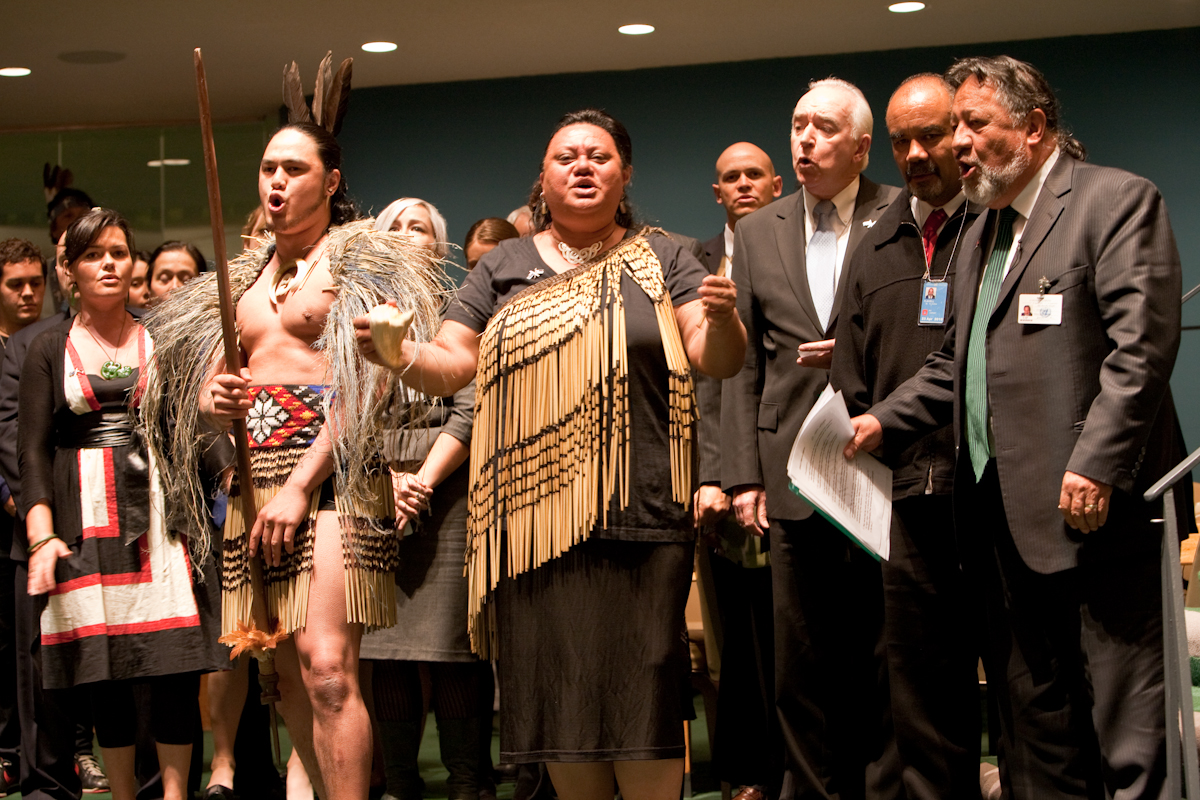
New Zealand delegation at the United Nations Permanent Forum on Indigenous Issues. New Zealand endorsed the Declaration on the Rights of Indigenous Peoples in April 2010.

In 2007 New Zealand's Minister of Māori Affairs, Parekura Horomia, described the declaration as "toothless", and said: "There are four provisions we have problems with, which make the declaration fundamentally incompatible with New Zealand's constitutional and legal arrangements." Article 26 in particular, he said, "appears to require recognition of rights to lands now lawfully owned by other citizens, both indigenous and non-indigenous. This ignores contemporary reality and would be impossible to implement."

In response, Māori Party leader Pita Sharples said it was "shameful to the extreme that New Zealand voted against the outlawing of discrimination against indigenous people; voted against justice, dignity and fundamental freedoms for all".

On July 7, 2009, the Key government announced that it would support the declaration; this, however, appeared to be a premature announcement by Pita Sharples, the then Minister of Māori Affairs, as the New Zealand government cautiously backtracked on Sharples' July announcement. However, on April 19, 2010, Sharples announced New Zealand's support of the declaration at a speech in New York.

Despite not being incorporated into law, UNDRIP has begun to influence policy and judicial decisions in New Zealand. For example, the Declaration has been referenced in several decisions of the Supreme Court of New Zealand and extensively in findings by the Waitangi Tribunal.

On 24 November 2023, the National-led coalition agreed not to recognize the declaration as having any binding legal effect on New Zealand as part of the coalition agreement. This coalition government also agreed to stop all work on He Puapua, which is a report on implementing the goals of UNDRIP in New Zealand.

==== United States ====
Speaking for the United States mission to the UN, spokesman Benjamin Chang said, "What was done today is not clear. The way it stands now is subject to multiple interpretations and doesn't establish a clear universal principle." The U.S. mission also issued a floor document, "Observations of the United States with respect to the Declaration on the Rights of Indigenous Peoples", setting out its objections to the declaration. Most of these are based on the same points as the three other countries' rejections but, in addition, the United States drew attention to the declaration's failure to provide a clear definition of exactly whom the term "indigenous peoples" is intended to cover.

On December 16, 2010, President Obama declared that the United States would "lend its support" to the declaration. The decision was announced during the second White House Tribal Nations Conference, where he said he is "working hard to live up to" the name that was given to him by the Crow Nation: "One Who Helps People Throughout the Land." Obama has told Native American leaders that he wants to improve the "nation-to-nation" relationship between the United States and the tribes and repair broken promises. Today, there are more than 560 Indian tribes in the United States that are recognized at the federal level, with some additional sixty-plus tribes recognized at the state level. Many had representatives at the White House conference and applauded Obama's announcement.

The Obama administration's decision came after three consultation meetings with Native Americans and more than 3,000 written comments on the subject. The support of the government also included several interpretations of the meaning of the declaration. In the view of the United States government, the declaration advances "a new and distinct international concept of self-determination specific to indigenous peoples," which is not the same as the existing concept in international law. The statement also interprets free, prior and informed consent, "which the United States understands to call for a process of meaningful consultation with tribal leaders, but not necessarily the agreement of those leaders, before the actions addressed in those consultations are taken."

=== By supporting countries ===
==== United Kingdom ====
Speaking on behalf of the United Kingdom Government, UK Ambassador and Deputy Permanent Representative to the United Nations, Karen Pierce, "emphasized that the Declaration was non-legally binding and did not propose to have any retroactive application on historical episodes. National minority groups and other ethnic groups within the territory of the United Kingdom and its overseas territories did not fall within the scope of the indigenous peoples to which the Declaration applied."

The UK position was also allegedly intended to prevent formal appeal of Canadian decisions to UK courts: Canadian indigenous peoples never accepted the 1982 constitution in which such appeal (regarding early treaties made with the Crown of the British Empire) was cut off. Under the prior 1867 constitution, 1920s Dominion of Canada and earlier law, which continue to apply to these peoples and treaties, the UNDRIP allegedly could have been pled in a UK court in conflicts between treaty and Canadian law. Calls to pursue this approach have been common among Canadian First Nations people.

==== Finland ====
Finland signed the International Declaration on the Rights of Indigenous Peoples when it was originally put forward. However the reindeer owners and Forest Administration (Metsähallitus) have a long dispute in the area of the forests. The UN Human Rights Committee ordered the Finnish State to stop logging in some of the disputed areas.

=== Abstentions ===
==== Russian Federation ====
The Russian Federation never reversed its abstention from the adoption of the UNDRIP. During the first review cycle of the Universal Periodic Review of 2009, it had accepted a recommendation by Mexico to "comply with the principles contained in the Declaration", yet in the second cycle, 2013, it rejected an almost identical recommendation by Estonia, claiming that its own legislation is already more advanced than the provisions of the UNDRIP.

==== Ukraine ====
Ukraine, which initially abstained from adopting the declaration, changed its approach to indigenous issues in response to the recent annexation of Crimea, asserting that Crimean Tatars are indigenous people. In May 2014, the country formally endorsed the UNDRIP. On June 1, 2021, Verkhovna Rada of Ukraine passed the law "On the Indigenous Peoples of Ukraine", regarding the status of Crimean Tatars, Crimean Karaites, and Krymchaks, which made reference to the UNDRIP.

==== Pacific Island states ====
Ten UN member states in the Pacific, all with indigenous majorities, were absent from the assembly at the time of the vote: Fiji, Kiribati, Marshall Islands, Nauru, Palau, Papua New Guinea, Solomon Islands, Tonga, Tuvalu, Vanuatu.

== See also ==
- Related international declarations, resolutions, and treaties:
  - Alta Outcome Document
  - Declaration on the Granting of Independence to Colonial Countries and Peoples and UN General Assembly Resolution 1654
  - Indigenous and Tribal Peoples Convention, 1989 (C169)
  - United Nations Declaration on the Rights of Peasants
  - Nagoya Protocol to the Convention on Biological Diversity
  - Biodiversity Beyond National Jurisdictions Agreement (BBNJ)
  - Treaty on Intellectual Property, Genetic Resources and Associated Traditional Knowledge (GRATK)
- Right to development
- Cultural rights
- Free, prior and informed consent
- Indigenous intellectual property
- Bioprospecting and biopiracy
- International Year of Indigenous Languages
- Settler colonialism in Canada
