= WIPO Treaty on Intellectual Property, Genetic Resources and Associated Traditional Knowledge =

Treaty on intellectual property

GRATK Treaty
WIPO Treaty on Intellectual Property, Genetic Resources and Associated Traditional Knowledge
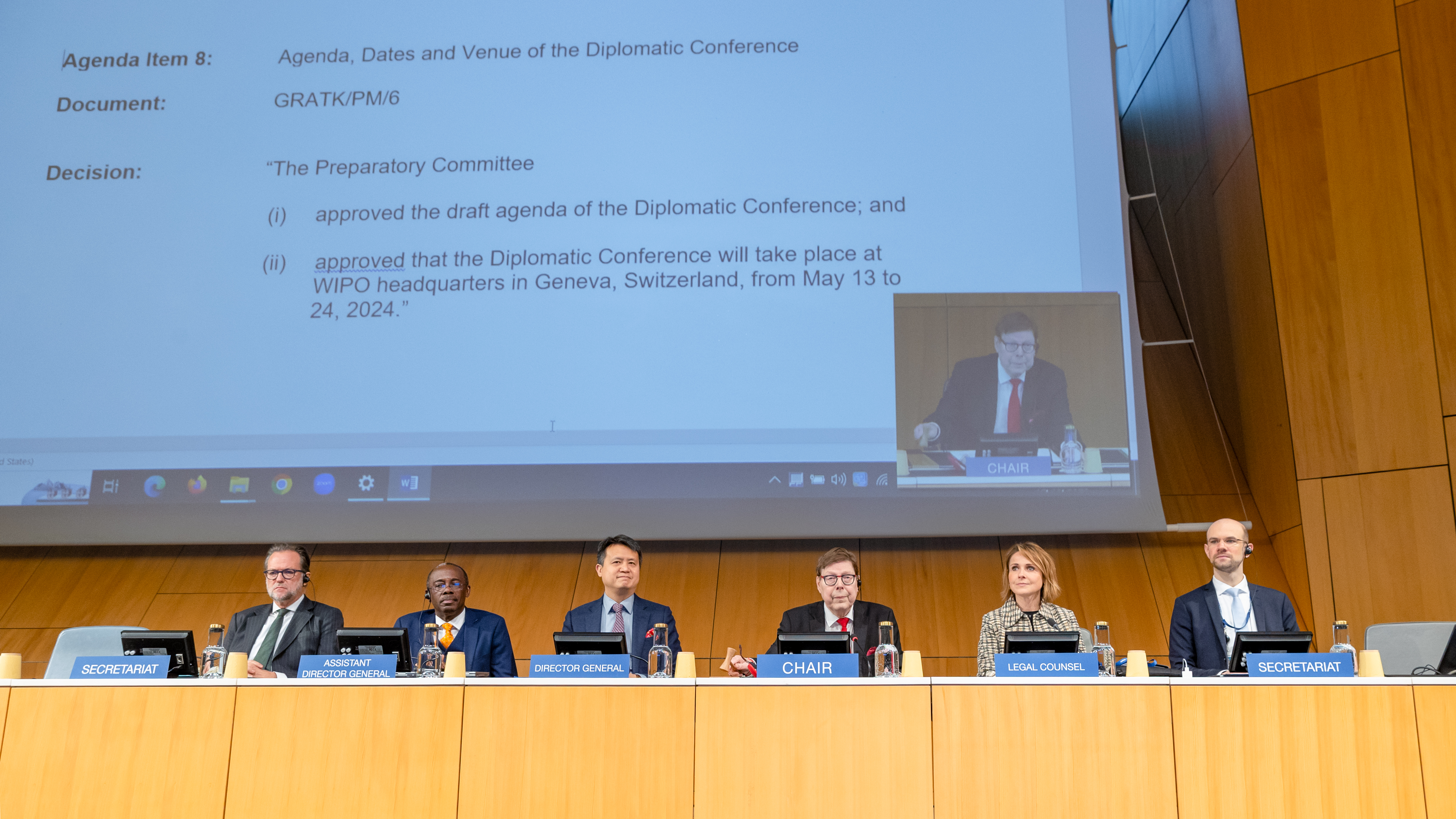
- View of the podium during the Preparatory Committee held ahead of the GRATK Diplomatic Conference (December 2023).
- Signed: Adopted 24 May 2024
- Location: WIPO headquarters, Geneva
- Effective: not in force
- Condition: Three months after 15 ratifications or accessions
- Signatories: 45 States: Algeria Bosnia and Herzegovina Brazil Burkina Faso Central African Republic Chile Colombia Congo Cote d'Ivoire Eswatini Ghana North Korea Lesotho Madagascar Malawi Marshall Islands Morocco Namibia Nicaragua Niger Nigeria Niue Paraguay Saint Vincent and the Grenadines São Tomé and Príncipe Senegal South Africa Tanzania Uruguay Vanuatu Gambia Peru Cabo Verde Indonesia Dominican Republic Zimbabwe Togo Uganda Australia Switzerland Zambia Iran Ecuador Bolivia
- Parties: 4 (Albania, Malawi, Peru, Uganda)
- Depositary: WIPO
- Languages: English, Arabic, Chinese, Spanish, French, Russian

The WIPO Treaty on Intellectual Property, Genetic Resources and Associated Traditional Knowledge or GRATK Treaty is an international legal instrument which aims to improve the efficacy, transparency and quality of the patent system and prevent patents from being granted that are not novel or inventive. The Treaty aims indirectly to combat biopiracy and facilitate compliance with access and benefit-sharing rules through disclosure requirements for patent applicants whose inventions are based on genetic resources and/or associated traditional knowledge.

The treaty was concluded at the headquarters of the World Intellectual Property Organization (WIPO) in Geneva, Switzerland, on 24 May 2024, after more than two decades of previous developments by WIPO's Intergovernmental Committee on Intellectual Property and Genetic Resources, Traditional Knowledge and Folklore (WIPO IGC).

The Treaty was adopted by consensus. Its adoption has been hailed in particular by developing countries and Indigenous Peoples. It was deemed "historic in many regards" by some observers, qualified by the Indigenous Caucus as a "first step towards guaranteeing just and transparent access to these resources." However, some developed countries and industry associations have begun to speak out against the Treaty.

== Background and history ==
=== 2001–2022: Work of the WIPO IGC ===
The committee was established in 2000 by the General Assembly of WIPO. It met for the first time in 2001.

Since 2010, the core of the mandate of the WIPO IGC has been (with some variations over the years) to undertake text-based negotiations with the objective of reaching agreement on a text of an international legal instrument (or instruments) which will ensure the effective protection of genetic resources, traditional knowledge and traditional cultural expressions.

In essence, the work of the WIPO IGC has aimed to bridge the gaps between the intellectual property system and numerous other international legal instruments that provide some, but insufficient protection to either traditional knowledge, traditional cultural expressions, or genetic resources (UNDRIP, Convention on Biological Diversity, Nagoya Protocol, FAO plant treaty, UNESCO conventions on intangible cultural heritage, etc.), none of which include explicit intellectual property-related protections for indigenous peoples and local communities.

WIPO IGC's negotiations were suspended in 2020 because of the COVID-19 pandemic, and resumed in 2022.

=== 2022: Selection of the draft text ===
In 2022, the WIPO General Assembly agreed to convene a Diplomatic Conference by 2024 to negotiate and adopt an international legal instrument relating to intellectual property, genetic resources and traditional knowledge associated with genetic resources.

The selection of the draft text that had to serve as a basis for the negotiations of the final text of the treaty received some criticism from civil society observers. The 2022 WIPO General Assembly decided that a "Chair's text" which had been drafted by Australian Ian Gross, Chair of the WIPO IGC from 2016 to 2022, would be the basis for the final stage negotiations. Prior to that decision, the text which was expected to be used as basis for the negotiations was the "Consolidated Document", a more comprehensive document on which WIPO IGC Member States had been working on by consensus during years.

Contrary to the Consolidated Document which was heavily bracketed and contained many options and alternatives, the Chair’s Text contained only one set of square brackets, because Goss had retained it as his text and not opened it up for amendments by the negotiators.

In August 2023, India submitted a proposal with a series of amendments to the Chair’s text, aiming to add back some elements from the Consolidated Document in the discussion.

=== 2023: WIPO IGC Special Session and Preparatory Committee ===
Ahead of the Diplomatic Conference, two extraordinary meetings were convened to prepare the Conference:

- Special Session of the WIPO IGC (4–8 September 2023)
- Preparatory Committee of the Diplomatic Conference (11–13 September, and 13 December 2023).

The Special Session which took place from 4 to 8 September 2023, reviewed part of the Chair's text containing substantive articles. The Preparatory Committee which was held the week after, addressed administrative and procedural parts of the draft. Jointly, these two meetings yielded a revised draft, which serves as the basis for the 2024 Diplomatic Conference discussions.

The Preparatory Committee also adopted Draft Rules of Procedure for the Diplomatic Conference, as well as a List of Invitees. On 13 September 2023, the committee had to suspend its session due to the absence of submission by Member States of proposals to host the Diplomatic Conference. On 13 December, the committee reconvened to adopt a decision to hold the Diplomatic Conference at WIPO's headquarters in Geneva, facing the lack of alternative proposals.

== Diplomatic Conference and adoption in 2024 ==
=== Convening and organization ===
As explained on the website of the Diplomatic Conference:

On July 21, 2022, the WIPO General Assembly decided to convene a Diplomatic Conference to conclude an International Legal Instrument Relating to Intellectual Property, Genetic Resources and Traditional Knowledge Associated with Genetic Resources no later than 2024.

The Diplomatic Conference was held in Geneva, Switzerland, between 13 and 24 May 2024. During the Conference, the draft resulting from the Special Session and Preparatory Committee was discussed and amended.

=== Participation at the Diplomatic Conference ===
Some 1,200 registered attendees participated in the Diplomatic Conference. 176 countries were represented as were the European Union, 14 intergovernmental organizations and 71 non-governmental organizations.

=== Adoption and signatures ===
The final legal instrument, the WIPO Treaty on Intellectual Property, Genetic Resources and Associated Traditional Knowledge (often referred to by its acronym "GRATK") was adopted in the night of Thursday 23 to Friday 24 May 2024, and opened for signature the 24 May in the afternoon, at the WIPO headquarter in Geneva.

This is the first WIPO Treaty to address the interface between intellectual property, genetic resources and traditional knowledge and the first WIPO Treaty to include provisions specifically for Indigenous Peoples as well as local communities. The Treaty, once it enters into force with 15 contracting parties, will establish in international law a new disclosure requirement for patent applicants whose inventions are based on genetic resources and/or associated traditional knowledge.

The Treaty was concluded on 24 May 2024 and immediately opened for signature. Under the Treaty's Article 16, it is stated that the Treaty will be "open for signature at the Diplomatic Conference in Geneva and thereafter […] for one year after its adoption."

At the closing of the Diplomatic Conference, on 24 May 2024, the Treaty was signed by 30 countries: Algeria, Bosnia and Herzegovina, Brazil, Burkina Faso, Central African Republic, Chile, Colombia, Congo, Côte d'Ivoire, Eswatini, Ghana, Lesotho, Madagascar, Malawi, Marshall Islands, Morocco, Namibia, Nicaragua, Niger, Nigeria, Niue, North Korea, Paraguay, Saint Vincent & the Grenadines, São Tomé and Príncipe, Senegal, South Africa, Tanzania, Uruguay, and Vanuatu.

At the end of the one-year period to sign the Treaty, May 24, 2025, the Treaty had been signed by 44 countries.

== Ratifications and entry into force ==
Under Article 17, the Treaty is planned to enter into force 3 months after ratification or accession by 15 countries.

Signature, ratification and accession is open to any Member State of the WIPO, under the Treaty's Article 12. Countries that signed the Treaty within the first year period (until 24 May 2025) have to further ratify it in order for the Treaty to enter into force. Countries deciding to join after the initial one-year period will join through "adhesion" (equivalent to both signature and ratification). At the end of the one-year period to sign the Treaty, May 24, 2025, the Treaty had been signed by 44 countries. As of June 2026, that number had increased to 45.

Accessions to the GRATK Treaty
WIPO Member States	Accession Process No. 1	
WIPO Member States	Signature	Ratification/Accession
Albania	13 March 2026	13 March 2026
Algeria	24 May 2024	
Australia	12 December 2024	
Bolivia		
Bosnia and Herzegovina	24 May 2024	
Brazil	24 May 2024	
Burkina Faso	24 May 2024	
Cabo Verde	8 July 2024	
Central African Republic	24 May 2024	
Chile	24 May 2024	
Colombia	24 May 2024	
Congo	24 May 2024	
Cote d'Ivoire	24 May 2024	
North Korea		
Dominican Republic	10 July 2024	
Ecuador	21 May 2025	
Eswatini	24 May 2024	
Gambia	28 May 2024	
Ghana	24 May 2024	
Indonesia	8 July 2024	
Iran	16 May 2025	
Lesotho	24 May 2024	
Madagascar	24 May 2024	
Malawi	24 May 2024	5 December 2024
Marshall Islands	24 May 2024	
Morocco	24 May 2024	
Namibia	24 May 2024	
Nicaragua	24 May 2024	
Niger	24 May 2024	
Nigeria	24 May 2024	
Niue	24 May 2024	
Paraguay	24 May 2024	
Peru	14 June 2024	08 July 2026
Saint Vincent and the Grenadines	24 May 2024	
São Tomé and Príncipe	24 May 2024	
Senegal	24 May 2024	
South Africa	24 May 2024	
Switzerland	4 March 2025	
Togo	3 December 2024	
Uganda	4 December 2024	9 July 2025
Tanzania	24 May 2024	
Uruguay	24 May 2024	
Vanuatu	24 May 2024	
Zambia	4 March 2025	
Zimbabwe	16 July 2024	

== Legal provisions ==
=== Preamble and objectives ===
The Preamble comprises a series of recitals which provide political backdrop for the Treaty and are useful in interpreting its operative provisions. The article on Objectives (Article 1) sets out the two formal objectives of the Treaty.

=== List of terms ===
Article 2 contains definitions of key terms used in the Treaty. For example, the term ‘based on’ is critical to the disclosure requirement in Article 3 of the Treaty.

=== Disclosures requirements ===
The heart of the Treaty is the disclosure requirement addressed in Article 3. This article also covers the roles of the patent office and opportunities for rectification.

=== Non-retroactivity ===
Article 4 of the Treaty provides that the obligations of the Treaty may not be imposed retroactively.

=== Sanctions and remedies ===
Article 5 addresses the measures that may be put in place to address a failure to comply with the disclosure obligation in Article 3.

=== Information systems such as databases ===
Parties to the Treaty may establish information systems (such as databases) of genetic resources and associated traditional knowledge. Article 6 provides guidance to parties should they wish to do so, and invites the Treaty’s Assembly to address related matters.

=== Relationships with other treaties ===
Article 7 governs the relationship between the Treaty and other relevant international agreements.

=== Review and other forms of amendment ===
The Treaty will be reviewed four years after it comes into force. The review is dealt with in Article 8 of the Treaty. Articles 14 and 15 deal with revisions and amendments of the Treaty.

=== Principles on implementation ===
Article 9 provides two general principles on how parties should implement the Treaty.

=== The Treaty’s Assembly and the Secretariat ===
The roles and powers of the Assembly are set out in Article 10. Article 11 addresses the role of the WIPO Secretariat (also known as the International Bureau). Under Article 22, WIPO’s Director General is the Treaty’s depositary.

=== Signature of the Treaty and becoming a party ===
Articles 12, 13 16, 17 and 18 deal with various aspect related to signing and joining the Treaty.

=== Denunciation and reservations ===
Article 19 explains how a party may denounce the Treaty. No reservations are permitted by Article 20 of the Treaty.

== See also ==
- World Intellectual Property Organization – Intergovernmental Committee on Intellectual Property and Genetic Resources, Traditional Knowledge and Folklore
- Biopiracy –– Bioprospecting
- Patents –– Patent Law Treaty –– Patent Cooperation Treaty
- Nagoya Protocol –– High Seas Treaty
- UNDRIP –– UNDROP
