= Nagoya Protocol =

2010 global treaty on biological diversity

Nagoya Protocol on Access to Genetic Resources and the Fair and Equitable Sharing of Benefits Arising from their Utilization to the Convention on Biological Diversity
- Parties signed, but not ratified non signatory, but Biological Diversity Convention party non signatory, non-Biological Diversity Convention party Besides several member states, the EU is also a party (not on map)
- Type: Environmental
- Signed: 29 October 2010
- Location: Nagoya, Japan
- Effective: 12 October 2014
- Condition: 50 ratifications
- Signatories: 92
- Parties: 142
- Depositary: Secretary-General of the United Nations
- Languages: Arabic, Chinese, English, French, Russian and Spanish

The Nagoya Protocol on Access to Genetic Resources and the Fair and Equitable Sharing of Benefits Arising from their Utilization to the Convention on Biological Diversity, also known as the Nagoya Protocol on Access and Benefit Sharing (ABS), is a 2010 supplementary agreement to the 1992 Convention on Biological Diversity (CBD). Its aim is the implementation of one of the three objectives of the CBD: the fair and equitable sharing of benefits arising out of the utilization of genetic resources, thereby contributing to the conservation and sustainable use of biodiversity. It sets out obligations for its contracting parties to take measures in relation to access to genetic resources, benefit-sharing and compliance.

The protocol was adopted on 29 October 2010 in Nagoya, Japan, and entered into force on 12 October 2014. As of August 2025, it has been ratified by 142 parties, which include 141 UN member states and the European Union.

From a concrete perspective, it gives each country sovereign rights over its biological resources, making biopiracy illegal. Concerns have been expressed that the added bureaucracy and legislation could be damaging to the monitoring and collection of biodiversity, to conservation, to the international response to infectious diseases, and to research.

== Aims and scope ==
The Nagoya Protocol applies to genetic resources that are covered by the CBD, and to the benefits arising from their utilization. The protocol also covers traditional knowledge associated with genetic resources that are covered by the CBD and the benefits arising from its utilization.

Its aim is the implementation of one of the three objectives of the CBD: the fair and equitable sharing of benefits arising out of the utilization of genetic resources, thereby contributing to the conservation and sustainable use of biodiversity.

== Adoption and ratification ==
The protocol was adopted on 29 October 2010 in Nagoya, Japan, at the tenth meeting of the Conference of the Parties, held from 18 to 29 October 2010 and entered into force on 12 October 2014.

The parties to the treaty decided in 2016 to consider the inclusion of digital sequence information (DSI) in the Nagoya framework. The Access and Benefit-Sharing (ABS) method, if applied to DSI, would have greatly disrupted the operations of the International Nucleotide Sequence Database Collaboration, in which all data is free and unrestricted. The multilateral framework for DSI, established in COP 15 (2022), decouples access from benefit-sharing.

== Obligations ==
The Nagoya Protocol sets out obligations for its contracting parties to take measures in relation to access to genetic resources, benefit-sharing and compliance.

=== Access obligations ===
Domestic-level access measures aim to:

- Create legal certainty, clarity, and transparency
- Provide fair and non-arbitrary rules and procedures
- Establish clear rules and procedures for prior informed consent and mutually agreed on terms
- Provide for issuance of a permit or equivalent when access is granted
- Create conditions to promote and encourage research contributing to biodiversity conservation and sustainable use
- Pay due regard to cases of present or imminent emergencies that threaten human, animal, or plant health
- Consider the importance of genetic resources for food and agriculture for food security

=== Benefit-sharing obligations ===
Domestic-level benefit-sharing measures aim to provide for the fair and equitable sharing of benefits arising from the utilization of genetic resources with the contracting party providing genetic resources. Utilization includes research and development on the genetic or biochemical composition of genetic resources, as well as subsequent applications and commercialization. Sharing is subject to mutually agreed terms. Benefits may be monetary or non-monetary such as royalties and the sharing of research results.

=== Compliance obligations ===
Specific obligations to support compliance with the domestic legislation or regulatory requirements of the contracting party providing genetic resources, and contractual obligations reflected in mutually agreed terms, are a significant innovation of the Nagoya Protocol.

Contracting parties are to:

- Take measures providing that genetic resources utilized within their jurisdiction have been accessed in accordance with prior informed consent, and that mutually agreed terms have been established, as required by another contracting party
- Cooperate in cases of an alleged violation of another contracting party's requirements
- Encourage contractual provisions on dispute resolution in mutually agreed terms
- Ensure an opportunity is available to seek recourse under their legal systems when disputes arise from mutually agreed terms (MAT)
- Take measures regarding access to justice
- Monitor the use of genetic resources after they leave a country by designating effective checkpoints at every stage of the value chain: research, development, innovation, pre-commercialization, or commercialization

== Implementation ==
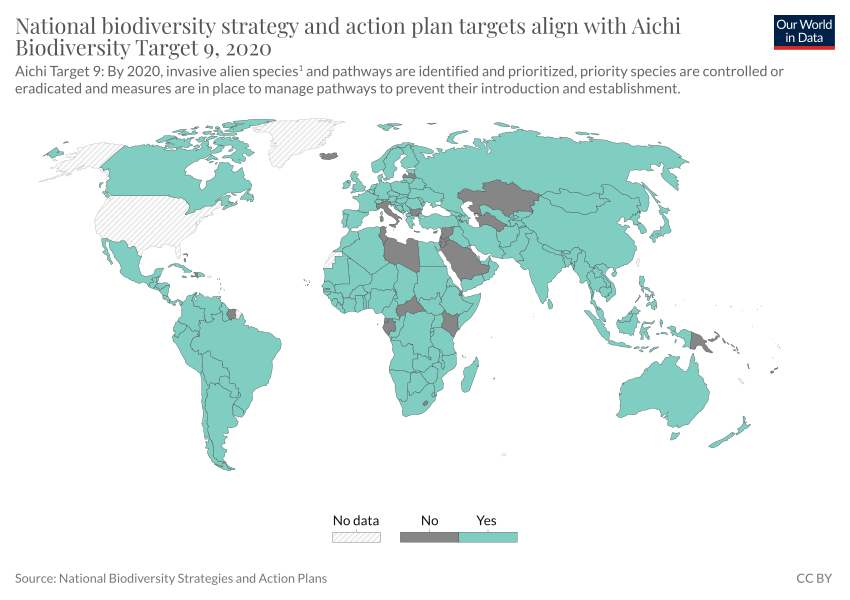
National biodiversity strategies that align with Aichi Target 9 (invasive species and pathways are identified and prioritized, priority species are controlled or eradicated and measures are in place to prevent their introduction and establishment)

The Nagoya Protocol's success will require effective implementation at the domestic level. A range of tools and mechanisms provided by the Nagoya Protocol will assist contracting parties including:

- Establishing national focal points (NFPs) and competent national authorities (CNAs) to serve as contact points for information, grant access, or compliance
- An Access and Benefit-sharing Clearing-House to share information, such as domestic regulatory ABS requirements or information on NFPs and CNAs
- Capacity-building to support key aspects of implementation.

Based on a country's self-assessment of national needs and priorities, capacity-building may help to:

- Develop domestic ABS legislation to implement the Nagoya Protocol
- Negotiate mutually-agreed terms
- Develop in-country research capability and institutions
- Raise awareness
- Transfer technology
- Target financial support for capacity-building and development initiatives through the GEF

=== European Union ===
The European Union has ratified a European Nagoya Protocol regulation to implement the Protocol.

- Scientists must file an unsolicited Due Diligence Declaration to national authorities when a biological resource is used in connection to a funded research project. The declaration promises to obey the Nogoya-related laws.
- Suppliers of biological resources such as DSMZ can certify that a resource is "Nagoya compliant" and provide information that can be used to fill the Due Diligence Declaration.
- Collection of a biological resource (e.g. live cells) need prior informed consent (PIC) and mutually agreed terms (MAT) documentation from National Focal Point and/or Competent National Authorities in the place of collection. Moving it to a different country requires a material transfer agreement (MTA) stating the purpose and restrictions of the transfer. If a researcher aims to deposit in a cultural collection, it should be communicated in the MTA that secondary distribution according to the MTA of the collection is allowed. A compliant culture collection such as DSMZ will check for all of these documentation.

== Relationship to other international agreements ==
A growing number of Preferential Trade Agreements (PTAs) include provisions related to access to genetic resources or to the sharing of the benefits that arise out of their utilization. Indeed, some recent trade agreements, originating notably from Latin American countries, provide specific measures designed to facilitate the implementation of the ABS provisions contained in the Nagoya Protocol, including measures related to technical assistance, transparency and dispute settlement.

== Criticism ==
However, there are concerns that the added bureaucracy and legislation will, overall, be damaging to the monitoring and collection of biodiversity, to conservation, to the international response to infectious diseases, and to research.

Many scientists have voiced concern over the protocol, fearing the increased red tape will hamper disease prevention and conservation efforts. Developing countries have refused to issue permits for basic biodiversity research unrelated to bioprospecting, even prosecuting the scientist in some cases. Scientists worry that threats of possible imprisonment of scientists will have a chilling effect on research.

Non-commercial biodiversity researchers and institutions such as natural history museums fear maintaining biological reference collections and exchanging material between institutions will become difficult. Museums have reservations about loaning out to developing countries for fear that the return "transfer" will not be approved.

The bilateral transfer framework of the Nagoya Protocol also has low throughput. In comparison, the International Treaty on Plant Genetic Resources for Food and Agriculture has a multilateral access/transfer framework via the Standard Material Transfer Agreement, allowing 8500 transfers every week. This is different from Article 10 of the Nagoya Protocol, which asks for a multilateral benefit-sharing framework, which has been continuously "revisited" without an actual implementation.

Lack of implementation at the national level was frequently attributed as a major factor behind the failure of Nagoya Protocol.

== See also ==
- Animal Genetic Resources for Food and Agriculture
- Bermuda Principles
- Cartagena Protocol on Biosafety, another supplementary protocol adopted by the CBD
- High Seas Treaty (BBNJ Agreement)
- International Year of Biodiversity
- WIPO Treaty on Intellectual Property, Genetic Resources and Associated Traditional Knowledge (GRATK)
