= High Seas Treaty =

International agreement for ocean protection

BBNJ Agreement
Agreement under the United Nations Convention on the Law of the Sea on the Conservation and Sustainable Use of Marine Biological Diversity of Areas Beyond National Jurisdiction
- Signatories (light blue) and ratifiers (green) of the treaty; those who did not sign are in grey.
- Type: International legally binding instrument
- Drafted: 4 March 2023
- Signed: 20 September 2023
- Location: New York
- Ratified: 19 September 2025
- Effective: 17 January 2026
- Condition: Ratification by 60 states
- Signatories: 145
- Parties: 104

The Agreement under the United Nations Convention on the Law of the Sea on the Conservation and Sustainable Use of Marine Biological Diversity of Areas beyond National Jurisdiction or BBNJ Agreement, commonly known as the High Seas Treaty, is a legally binding instrument for the conservation and sustainable use of marine biological diversity of areas beyond national jurisdiction. It is an agreement under the United Nations Convention on the Law of the Sea (UNCLOS). The text was finalised during an intergovernmental conference at the UN on 4 March 2023 and adopted on 19 June 2023. For entering into force, the treaty needed to be ratified by at least 60 UN member states. On 19 September 2025, Morocco became the 60th country to ratify the agreement, setting the stage for its entry into force in January 2026.

In 2017, the United Nations General Assembly (UNGA) voted to convene an intergovernmental conference (IGC) to consider establishing an international legally binding instrument (ILBI) on the conservation and sustainable use of marine biodiversity beyond national jurisdiction (BBNJ). This was considered necessary because UNCLOS did not provide a framework for areas beyond national jurisdiction. There was a particular concern for marine biodiversity and the impact of overfishing on global fish stocks and ecosystem stability.

The treaty addresses four themes: (1) marine genetic resources (MGRs) and their digital sequence information (genetic data), including the fair and equitable sharing of benefits; (2) area-based management tools (ABMTs), including marine protected areas (MPAs); (3) environmental impact assessments (EIAs); and (4) capacity building and transfer of marine technology (CB&TMT). The area-based management tools and environmental impact assessments relate mainly to conservation and sustainable use of marine biodiversity, while the marine genetic resources and capacity building and transfer of marine technology include issues of economic justice and equity.

Greenpeace called it "the biggest conservation victory ever". The main achievement is the new possibility to create marine protected areas in international waters. By doing so the agreement now makes it possible to protect 30% of the oceans by 2030 (part of the 30 by 30 target). Though the agreement does not directly address climate change, it also serves as a step towards protecting the ecosystems that store carbon in sediments.

The High Seas Treaty has 76 articles and two annexes. One of its main aims is "to act as stewards of the ocean in areas beyond national jurisdiction on behalf of present and future generations by protecting, caring for and ensuring responsible use of the marine environment, maintaining the integrity of ocean ecosystems and conserving the inherent value of biological diversity of areas beyond national jurisdiction". The Agreement recognizes traditional knowledge. It has articles regarding the "polluter-pays" principle, and different impacts of human activities including areas beyond the national jurisdiction of the countries making those activities. The agreement was adopted by the 193 United Nations Member States.

Both states and regional economic integration organizations can become parties to the Agreement. The former treaty, UNCLOS, was adopted in 1982 and entered into force in 1994. As of October 2024, UNCLOS has 170 parties. The European Union pledged financial support for the process of ratification and implementation of the treaty.

== Context ==
International waters are the areas shown in dark blue in this map, i.e. outside exclusive economic zones, which are in light blue.

The world's oceans are facing a severe decline in biodiversity and degradation of ecosystems due to threats related to climate change and the expansion of human activities, such as shipping, overfishing, plastic pollution and deep-sea mining. Consequently, there is a pressing need for a more cohesive ocean governance framework, since the existing framework is too fragmented and incomplete to effectively secure the conservation and sustainable use of marine biodiversity in areas beyond national jurisdiction. The High Seas treaty aims to address the regulatory gaps, by promoting coherence and coordination with and among existing institutions, frameworks, and bodies.

Areas beyond national jurisdiction comprise the 'high seas' (water column beyond the national jurisdiction of countries) and the 'area' (international seabed area), making up about two-thirds of the ocean. The areas are currently regulated by different regional and sectoral agreements, such as regional fisheries management organisations (RFMOs). However, they can only implement measures within their own respective mandates and cooperation is lacking. Additionally, only a few areas are covered, leaving the majority effectively unregulated. The remaining one-third of the ocean falls under national jurisdiction and is situated within the exclusive economic zones (EEZs). The exclusive economic zones extend 200 nautical miles (about 370 km) from the territorial sea baseline. The zones are established under UNCLOS, giving coastal states the jurisdiction over the living and non-living resources within the water and the seabeds.

The common name "High Seas Treaty" has been criticized by some as inaccurate and omitting biodiversity.

== History ==
A new agreement under UNCLOS for areas beyond national jurisdiction has been discussed at the United Nations for almost 20 years. The United Nations began preparatory meetings in 2004 to lay the foundation for an Implementing Agreement to UNCLOS addressing governance and regulatory gaps.

On 24 December 2017, the United Nations General Assembly adopted Resolution 72/249 to convene an intergovernmental conference and undertake formal negotiations for a new international legally binding instrument under the UNCLOS for the conservation and sustainable development of marine biological diversity in areas beyond national jurisdiction. Between 2018 and 2023, diplomats have gathered at the UN Headquarters in New York City for negotiating sessions. There have so far been five sessions in total.

The intergovernmental conference (IGC) convened a total of five sessions in 2018, 2019, 2022 and 2023 to negotiate the text for the BBNJ legal instrument:

During the first session in September 2018, the concept of 'Beyond National Jurisdiction' seemed to have a greater influence on positions taken than the direct concerns regarding 'Biodiversity' itself.

- In the second session March/April 2019, it became clear that the principle stating that the new BBNJ agreement "should not undermine" existing institutions could be a hindrance, impeding progress towards achieving an effective instrument.
- The third session in August 2019 evolved around the dichotomy between 'the freedom of the seas' and 'the common heritage of mankind' principles.
- The fourth session was originally scheduled for 2020, but it had to be postponed until March 2022 because of the COVID-19 pandemic. During the session, a lack of political will was observed, as states continued to object to substantive, key issues for a new treaty. Progress was made in the four main elements: marine genetic resources (MGRs), benefit sharing using area-based management tools (ABMTs) including marine protected areas (MPAs), environmental impact assessments (EIAs) and capacity building and the transfer of marine technology (CB&TT).
- The fifth round of talks in August 2022 failed to produce an agreement, due in part to significant disagreements over how to share benefits derived from marine genetic resources and digital sequence information. It was therefore agreed to suspend the session and resume it at a later date.
- Agreement on a text was reached on 4 March 2023, after the sixth round of talks at the UN in New York. In February/March 2023, the final text was agreed upon, after almost two decades of work. With the words "the ship has reached the shore", Rena Lee, the president of the intergovernmental conference, announced the final agreement. The treaty opened for signature in New York City on 20 September, a day after a summit on the Sustainable Development Goals. Signatures will be open for two years from 20 September 2023.

In January 2024, Ambassador Ilana Seid presented the agreement of Palau to the treaty. Palau was the first of sixty countries required to ratify the treaty for it to enter into force.

The third UN Ocean Conference took place in June 2025 in Nice, France. During the conference, 19 additional countries ratified the treaty, bringing the total number to 51. There were also a further 20 signatories.

On 19 September 2025, Morocco became the 60th country to ratify the agreement, setting the stage for its entry into force in January 2026.

== Content of the treaty ==
=== Marine genetic resources (MGRs), including the fair and equitable sharing of benefits ===
Marine genetic resources (MGRs), including the fair and equitable sharing of benefits is the first element mentioned in the treaty. Among other things, marine genetic resources can enable production of biochemicals that can be used in cosmetics, pharmaceuticals and food supplements. The economic value of the resources is for now unclear, but the potential for profits has created an increased interest in the resources exploration and exploitation among stakeholders.

During the UN negotiations it has been a contentious point whether or not marine genetic resources should apply to 'fish' and 'fishing activities'. If not, it would be likely to impact the ability of the High Seas treaty to address its objective, since fish are a major component of marine biodiversity and play an essential role in the functioning of marine ecosystems, according to some experts. However, the final treaty text states that the provisions about marine genetic resources do not apply to 'fish' and 'fishing' in areas beyond national jurisdiction.

The part about fair and equitable sharing of benefits has also been a point of dispute in the negotiations. In the end it was agreed upon to regulate non-monetary as well as monetary benefits. Furthermore, an access and benefit-sharing (ABS) committee will be established with the purpose of providing guidelines for the benefit-sharing, and ensuring that this is done in a transparent, fair, and equitable way.

=== Area-based management tools (ABMTs), including marine protected areas (MPAs) ===
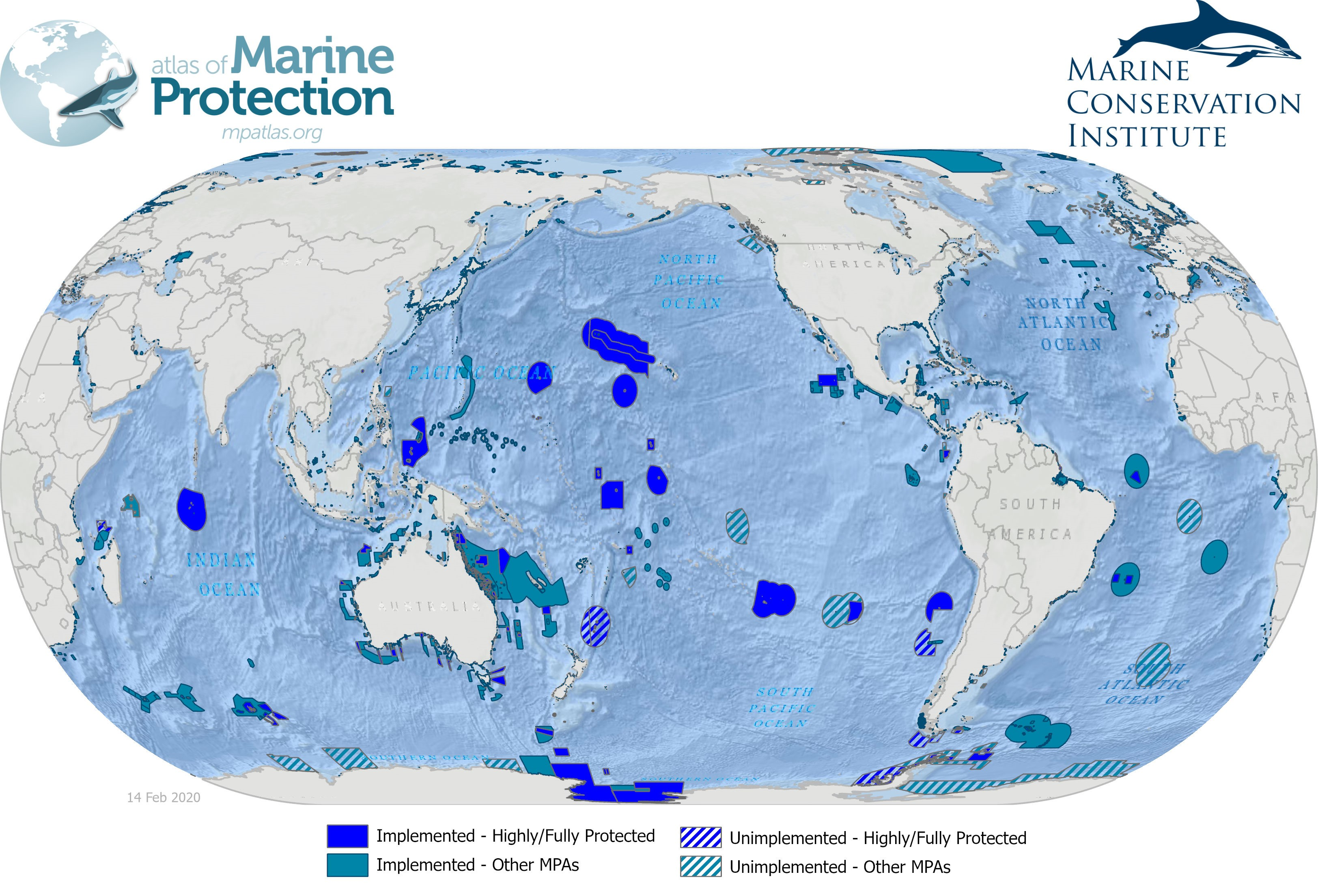
Marine protected areas as of 2020 (data from MPAtlas).

Area-based management tools (ABMTs), including marine protected areas (MPAs) are recognized as key tools for conserving and restoring biodiversity. They can be used to protect, preserve and maintain certain areas beyond national jurisdiction. Marine protected areas offer a degree of long term conservation, and are already established in some areas. However, the protection level of biodiversity varies a lot and the protected areas only cover a small proportion of the areas beyond national jurisdiction. Area based management tools can be used for short-term and emergency measures and to address a specific sector.

The process to establish a tool or a protected area is as follows. First, a party under the High Seas treaty has to submit a proposal for an area-based management tool or a marine protected area. The proposal has to be based on the best available sciences and information. It will be made publicly available and transmitted to the Scientific and Technical Body to be reviewed. Hereafter, relevant stakeholders have to be consulted. The proposal has to be adopted by consensus - or if this is not possible, three-quarter majority of the representatives present and voting. The decision will enter into force within 120 days after the voting, and will be binding for all parties of the treaty. However, if a party within the 120 days makes an objection to the decision, an opt-out is possible.

After the treaty text was finalised, it has been reported that the treaty through marine protected areas will protect 30% of the oceans by 2030 - a target adopted at the UN Biodiversity Conference (COP15) in December 2022 - however this is not the case, according to experts. The treaty can help to implement the 30 by 30 biodiversity target in the oceans, but it will a require a lot of action by states.

=== Environmental impact assessments (EIAs) ===
Environmental impact assessments have the potential to predict, reduce and prevent human activities affecting marine biodiversity and ecosystems. While the institutional and legal framework for environmental impact assessments is well established in areas within national jurisdiction, it is less developed in areas beyond. Under the treaty, participating parties are obliged to conduct environmental impact assessments when a planned activity may have an effect on the marine environment, or when there is insufficient knowledge about its potential effects. In such cases, the party possessing jurisdiction or control over the activity is required to conduct the assessment.

The treaty also includes provisions for Strategic Environmental Assessments (SEAs), which are assessments that are more holistic and focused on long-term environmental protection compared to the more specific focus of environmental impact assessments. Parties under the treaty have to consider conducting a strategic environmental assessment for plans and programmes related to their activities in areas beyond national jurisdiction, but are not obliged to conduct one.

=== Capacity building and the transfer of marine technology (CB&TMT) ===
Capacity building and the transfer of marine technology concerns the equitable access to research conducted in international waters and enabling cooperation and participation in the activities outlined in the agreement. Different types of capacity building and transfer of technology are mentioned in the agreement, such as sharing of information and research results; develop and share manuals, guidelines and standards; collaboration and cooperation in marine science; and develop and strengthen institutional capacity and national regulation or mechanisms.

Technology plays an important role in the implementation, making capacity building and technology transfer essential for the enforcement of the treaty. A key focus is to support developing and geographically disadvantaged states in implementing the agreement.

Furthermore, a capacity-building and transfer of marine technology committee will be established, in order to monitor and review the undertaken initiatives, under the authority of the Conference of the Parties.

== Institutional framework ==
The treaty introduces a new institutional framework in part VI about 'Institutional Arrangements', including the Conference of the Parties, the Scientific and Technical Body, the secretariat and the clearing-house mechanism.

The Conference of the parties (COP) will have its first meeting one year after the treaty enters into force, at the latest. The rules of procedure and the financial rules will be adopted at the first meeting. The Conference of the Parties will review and evaluate the implementation of the High Seas treaty. The Conference has to take decisions and adopt recommendations by consensus - or if it is not possible to reach consensus after all efforts have been exhausted, adopted by a two-thirds majority of the parties present and voting. The Conference will also have to promote transparency in the implementation of the agreement and the related activities. Five years after the treaty enters into force, the Conference of Parties has to review the treaty.

The Scientific and Technical Body will be composed of members nominated by the parties and elected by the Conference of the Parties, serving as experts and in the best interest of the agreement. The need for multidisciplinary expertise has to be taken into account in the nomination and election of members. The Scientific and Technical Body will among other things provide scientific and technical advice to the Conference of the Parties, monitor and review area-based management tools and comment on environmental impact assessments.

The secretariat is responsible for providing administrative and logistical support to the Conference of the Parties and its subsidiary bodies. This includes tasks, such as arranging and servicing the meetings, as well as circulating information relating to the implementation of the treaty in a timely manner.

The clearing-house mechanism will work as an open-access platform, facilitating the access, provision, and dissemination of information. It will promote transparency and facilitate international cooperation and collaboration. The mechanism will be managed by the secretariat.

In addition, the treaty establishes an 'access and benefit-sharing committee' (BBNJ ABS Committee), a 'capacity-building and transfer of marine technology committee', a 'finance committee on financial resources' and an 'implementation and compliance committee'. However, these are not mentioned in the section about institutional arrangements.

== Financial support ==
The European Union pledged financial support for the process of ratification and implementation of the treaty.

== See also ==
- United Nations Convention on the Law of the Sea
- 2022 United Nations Biodiversity Conference
- Kunming-Montreal Global Biodiversity Framework
- High seas fisheries management
- Nagoya Protocol to the Convention on Biological Diversity
- Treaty on Intellectual Property, Genetic Resources and Associated Traditional Knowledge (GRATK)
- 2025 United Nations Ocean Conference
