= Brachyspira =

Scientific classification
- Domain: Bacteria
- Kingdom: Pseudomonadati
- Phylum: Spirochaetota
- Class: Spirochaetia
- Order: Brachyspirales
- Family: Brachyspiraceae
- Genus: Brachyspira; Hovind-Hougen et al. 1983 non Foliella non Pfeiffer 1855

Type species
- Brachyspira aalborgi Hovind-Hougen et al. 1983

Species
- See text

Synonyms
- "Anguillina" Lee et al. 1993 non Cossmann 1912 non Hammerschmidt 1839; Serpula Stanton et al. 1991 non (Persson 1801) Gray 1821 non Linnaeus 1758 non Coy 1862; Serpulina Stanton 1992 non Zborzevski 1834

Genus of bacteria

Brachyspira is a genus of bacteria classified within the phylum Spirochaetota.

Brachyspira species include pathogens in pigs, birds, dogs, and humans.

B. pilosicoli colonizes millions of humans worldwide, leading to human intestinal spirochaetosis, a chronic, intermittent watery diarrhea vastly underdiagnosed because of the lack of a simple diagnostic tool for clinicians. Multiplex qPCRs are promising diagnostic tools, as Brachyspira do not grow on conventional media.

B. pilosicoli also cause avian spirochetosis: birds might be considered as the natural reservoir.

B. hyodysenteriae leads to diarrheal disease in growing pigs worldwide, causing the so-called swine dysentery, typhlocolitis or porcine intestinal spirochaetosis, which contributes to major "production losses" in agrobusiness.

Some species like B. innocens or B. intermedia seem to be less virulent.

== Phylogeny ==
The currently accepted taxonomy is based on the List of Prokaryotic names with Standing in Nomenclature (LPSN) and National Center for Biotechnology Information (NCBI).

16S rRNA based LTP_10_2024

- Brachyspira
  - B. aalborgi
  - - B. pilosicoli
    - - B. hyodysenteriae
      - - B. suanatina
        - - - B. alvinipulli
            - B. hampsonii
          - - B. innocens
            - - B. intermedia
              - B. murdochii

120 marker proteins based GTDB 10-RS226

- Brachyspira
  - - B. aalborgi Hovind-Hougen et al. 1983 (type sp.)
    - "B. catarrhinii" Phillips, La & Hampson 2019
  - - B. pilosicoli (Trott et al. 1996) Ochiai et al. 1998
    - - B. alvinipulli Stanton et al. 1998
      - - - "B. pulli" Stephens & Hampson 2001
          - - B. innocens (Kinyon and Harris 1979) Ochiai et al. 1998
            - B. murdochii (Stanton et al. 1997) Hampson and La 2006
        - - B. hampsonii Mirajkar et al. 2017
          - - B. hyodysenteriae (Harris et al. 1972) Ochiai et al. 1998
            - - B. intermedia (Stanton et al. 1997) Hampson and La 2006
              - B. suanatina Mushtaq et al. 2016

Species incertae sedis:

- "B. canis" (Duhamel et al. 1998) Oxberry & Hamspon 2003
- "B. corvi" Jansson, Fellstrom & Johansson 2008
- "B. ibaraki" Tachibana et al. 2003(presumably an 16S-rDNA variant of B. aalborgi)
- "B. muridarum" Backhans, Johansson & Fellstrom 2010
- "B. muris" Backhans, Johansson & Fellstrom 2010
- "B. rattus" Backhans, Johansson & Fellstrom 2010

== Pathogenesis of human intestinal spirochetosis (HIS) ==
Brachyspira bacteria have evolved a parasitic lifestyle through genomic reduction (~2.5 to 3.3 Mb) compared to other gram negative bacteria (~5 Mb).

Humans become infected through dirty water ingestion, possibly by swimming in waters containing the bacteria or by direct oral exposure to contaminated feces (outdoor tribes, raw egg eaters, slum inhabitants with no sanitation, MSM).

Genome homologies between Borellia, Treponema and Brachyspira imply that Brachyspira is expected to:

- import carbohydrates and short fatty acids (6->3 carbons) for its energetic needs from the colon lumen,
- swim to and through (viscotaxis) mucin layers thanks to its spiroid shape and flagellum (see film),
- attach to colonocytes apically and to each other laterally,
- thereby creating a continuous layer of bacterial cells which can withstand feces movement in vivo: this is the pathognomonic brush border seen in histology on colonic biopsies
- it is still to be elucidated if Brachyspira is, as Borrelia, able to attach to decorin and progress in loose connective tissue and invade other tissues,
- as for borrelia and syphilis, Brachyspira may be able to translocate to seminal vesicles where it would find another niche "outside" the body with mucins to invade, epithelia to attach and glucose available. Brachyspira may be a sexually transmittable disease in MSM communities via ano-oral route but also penetrative route.

Once attached apically to the enterocyte, hidden to the natural and acquired immunity by the mucous layer and occupying a niche that other bacteria cannot use, Brachyspira most likely expresses at its apex porins allowing it to import from the colonocyte's cytoplasm the amino acids and nucleic acids necessary to replicate.

It has also been demonstrated that Brachyspira creates an environment which is favorable to its locomotion by upregulating mucin expression: it creates its own niche.

== Clinical manifestations in human medicine ==
Publications now tend to point out that Brachyspira colonization should not be considered harmless commensalism:

- Chronic diarrhea
- Irritable bowel syndrome
- Acute intestinal pain
- Ulcerative colitis
- Post translocation spirochetemia and cardiogenic shock

== Antibiotic treatment and resistances in human medicine ==
Treatment with 10 days co-amoxicilline 1g bid + metronidazole 500 tid seems to have very good results on abdominal symptoms. It is advised to administer Saccharomyces boulardii once a day during this course of antibiotherapy.

Doxycycline resistance has been documented and should be avoided.

== Antibiotic treatment and resistance in veterinary medicine ==
Veterinary antibiotics used to treat pigs with dysentery due to Brachyspira species include the lincosamide lincomycin, the ionophore salinomycin, the quinoxaline carbadox, the pleuromodulins tiamulin and valnemulin, as well as the aminoglycoside gentamicin, an important antibiotic used in humans.

Brachyspira resistance to the above antibiotics has been increasingly reported. While no Clinical and Laboratory Standards Institute (CLSI) antimicrobial breakpoints for Brachyspira have been established, resistance to the pleuromodulins tiamulin and valnemulin is considered at MIC ≥ 2 μg/ml. Resistance to pleuromodulins is important, because they are antibiotics of "last resort"; as of 2001, they were the only antibiotics with sufficient minimum inhibitory concentration (MIC) values left to treat swine dysentery in Sweden, per the National Veterinary Institute in Uppsala.

Antibiotic resistance varies by geographic region and is not developing as rapidly in U.S. isolates as has been seen in isolates from other countries. Tiamulin resistance was first described in 1996 in Hungary, and subsequently reported from other countries in Europe and Asia. In Spain, 7.4% of Brachyspira isolates were reported to be venamulin-resistant and 17.6% were tiamulin-resistant in 2009. In Sweden, 10-15% of B. pilosicoli isolates between 2002 and 2010 were resistant to tiamulin (MICs >4 μg/ml), and a gradual increase in tiamulin MICs was seen in B. hyodysenteriae between 1990 and 2003, which has since plateaued.

Decreased susceptibility to lincomycin, but not to tiamulin was found among Polish isolates.

In the US, resistance of Brachyspira species collected 2008–2010 was common only against lincomycin (80% had MIC of 32 or 64), MIC's were moderately high against gentamicin, while resistance to valnemulin(4.7%) and tiamulin (3.2% of isolates) was yet uncommon, as reported in the only U.S. study to date, from Iowa.

The use of pleuromodulins in U.S. food animals is not separately reported in the U.S. Food and Drug Administration's annual Animal Drug User Fee Act (ADUFA) report, "Antimicrobials Sold or Distributed for Use in Food-Producing Animals". However, the amount of 190 tonnes of lincosamides used is substantial per ADUFA; antibiotics used in the U.S. in food animals in 2011 was: Ionophores 4,123,259 kg, aminoglycosides 214,895 kg, and Lincosamides 190,101 kg.

== Microbiologic identification ==
Brachyspira are capable of hemolysis, the degree of which has been used to characterize them, with B. hyodysenteriae showing strong beta hemolysis while B. pilosicoli, B. intermedia, B. murdochii, and B. innocens have been described as weakly hemolytic. However, in a recent study from Iowa State University, all (10/10) B. intermedia isolates, 91% (9/11) of Brachyspira spp. isolates, and 20% (2/6) of B. pilosicoli isolates from farms in North Carolina (36), Iowa (23), Minnesota (9), Nebraska (3), Michigan (2), Illinois (2), Missouri (1), North Dakota (1), South Dakota (1), and Ohio (1), demonstrated strong beta-hemolysis.

Recently quantitative PCR seems to be a more sensitive way to identify Brachyspira, which is globally a very fastidious bacterium to grow.

== Change in ecology ==
In the U.S.A. Brachyspira-associated pig disease and isolation of Brachyspira species from swine with diarrheal disease largely disappeared from swine herds in the late 1990s and early 2000s, but returned in the mid-2000s for unknown reasons.

A 2011 study of isolates from Midwestern swine herds described major changes in Brachyspira spp frequency and hemolysis, i.e. pathogenicity: the majority of isolated Brachyspira species were previously considered minimally pathogenic or commensal, like Brachyspira murdochi (27%)or novel/unclassifiable Brachyspira species (25%), while only 40.5% of 79 isolates from diseased pigs could be confirmed as the classic pathogens B. hyodysenteriae or Brachyspira pilosicoli by PCR. Brachyspira species previously capable of weak hemolysis only, like B. intermedia and B. pilosicoli were found to produce strong hemolysis. They were also frequently identified from diseased swine which suggests they are emerging pathogens.

A compelling explanation for this change in epidemiology and ecology is selection by the increasing use of antibiotics in pigs (e.g. as growth promoters), since B. murdochii and unclassifiable Brachyspira spp. are less susceptible to antimicrobials than the previously established Brachyspira pathogens.

== See also ==
- List of bacteria genera
- List of bacterial orders
