= Brachyspira innocens =

Scientific classification
- Domain: Bacteria
- Kingdom: Pseudomonadati
- Phylum: Spirochaetota
- Class: Spirochaetia
- Order: Brachyspirales
- Family: Brachyspiraceae
- Genus: Brachyspira
- Species: B. innocens

Binomial name
- Brachyspira innocens (Kinyon and Harris 1979) Ochiai et al. 1998

Synonyms
- Serpulina innocens (Kinyon and Harris 1979) Stanton 1992; Serpula innocens (Kinyon and Harris 1979) Stanton et al. 1991; Treponema innocens Kinyon and Harris 1979 (Approved Lists 1980)

Species of bacterium

Brachyspira innocens is a species of bacteria. It is thought to be a commensal bacterium.
