= Brachyspira alvinipulli =

Scientific classification
- Domain: Bacteria
- Kingdom: Pseudomonadati
- Phylum: Spirochaetota
- Class: Spirochaetia
- Order: Brachyspirales
- Family: Brachyspiraceae
- Genus: Brachyspira
- Species: B. alvinipulli

Binomial name
- Brachyspira alvinipulli corrig. Stanton et al. 1998

Synonyms
- Serpulina alvinipulli Stanton et al. 1998

Species of bacterium

Brachyspira alvinipulli is a bacterium that is enteropathogenic for chickens. It is an anaerobic spirochaete with type strain C1^{T} (= ATCC 51933^{T}).
