= Brachyspira pilosicoli =

Scientific classification
- Domain: Bacteria
- Kingdom: Pseudomonadati
- Phylum: Spirochaetota
- Class: Spirochaetia
- Order: Brachyspirales
- Family: Brachyspiraceae
- Genus: Brachyspira
- Species: B. pilosicoli

Binomial name
- Brachyspira pilosicoli Brandt and Ingvorsen, 1998

Synonyms
- Serpulina pilosicoli

Species of bacterium

Brachyspira pilosicoli is a gram-negative, anaerobic, host-associated spirochete that colonizes the intestinal tract of animals and humans. It appears as a characteristic "false brush border" due to its end-on attachment to enterocytes of the colon where it interferes with intestinal absorption. B. pilosicoli is unique from other Brachyspira species because it colonizes a variety of domestic animals including pigs, chickens, dogs, wild birds, rodents, and humans. It is the causative agent of intestinal spirochetosis in pigs, chickens, and humans. In particular, B. pilosicoli has been described as an important colonic pathogen of pigs and chickens, causing colitis and diarrhea resulting in depressed rates of growth and impaired production on farms where infections with B. pilosicoli may be endemic. Bacterial attachment disrupts the colonic enterocytes and associated villi, causing the symptoms characteristic of intestinal spirochetosis. Additionally, B. pilosicoli is associated with clinical disease in human infections where it has implications for public health.

== History ==
Although spirochetes have been described dating back to 1877, it would be another hundred years before Brachyspira pilosicoli would be first described in 1980 and recognized as a causative agent of diarrhea and dysentery in pigs. This distinction was made as isolates from pigs exhibiting diarrhea differed from Brachyspira hyodysenteriae (previously Treponema hyodysenteriae), the presumed pathogen, in both their gross and microscopic morphology and their pathological presentation. This distinction was furthered when Brachyspira pilosicoli was attributed as the pathological agent of "intestinal spirochetosis". This name reflected the microscopic description of how the spirochete organisms coat the enterocytes creating an appearance similar to a healthy brush border, despite the ongoing colitis and mucoid diarrhea. This, however, was disputed by Dr. Claude O. Burdick who suggested that the "false brush border" was simply normal intestinal microvilli sectioned tangentially, giving a spirochete-like morphology.

Following these early descriptions, Brachyspira pilosicoli was discovered in various human populations including Asian communities, homosexual communities, and a wide variety of communities within Muscat, the capital of Oman. Around the same time, the species was also identified widely in chickens and was attributed to lost production within the poultry industry. It wasn't until the mid-1990s that the pathogen was attributed to all three host species under the species name Brachyspira pilosicoli. Following this unification, the bacteria were described in several other bird species, rodents, dogs, and horses. Despite being isolated in other species, Brachyspira pilosicoli remains predominantly a spirochete associated with porcine intestinal spirochetosis.

== Microbiological characteristics ==
Brachyspira pilosicoli is a gram-negative, anaerobic, spirochete bacterium that is approximately 4 - 10 um in length and 0.2 - 0.3 um in width. It is a very resilient bacterium that has been known to tolerate direct oxygen exposure despite being anaerobic. The spirochete uses periplasmic flagella located at both ends of the cell to move and each cell has 8 or 10 flagella contained within its outer envelope. A distinguishing feature of B. pilosicoli is that it belongs to a group of gram-negative bacteria that contain lipooligosaccharide in their outer membrane instead of lipopolysaccharide. The optimum temperature for growth occurs between 37 and 42 °C.

On culture or broth, this species is difficult to grow and it lacks the characteristic traits needed for identification at a species level. Because of this, to accurately determine species-level identification of Brachyspira species, genetic sequencing should be considered (i.e. PCR). However, when it is isolated and grown, B. pilosicoli takes a minimum of 3 days to grow on trypticase soy blood agar, where it is seen as a translucent film coating the surface of the agar. There is also an area of weak beta-hemolysis encompassing the film. It was previously thought that B. pilosicoli could be differentiated from other Brachyspira species because it is hippurate hydrolysis positive; however, hippurate-negative strains have also been documented.

== Virulence factors and pathogenesis ==
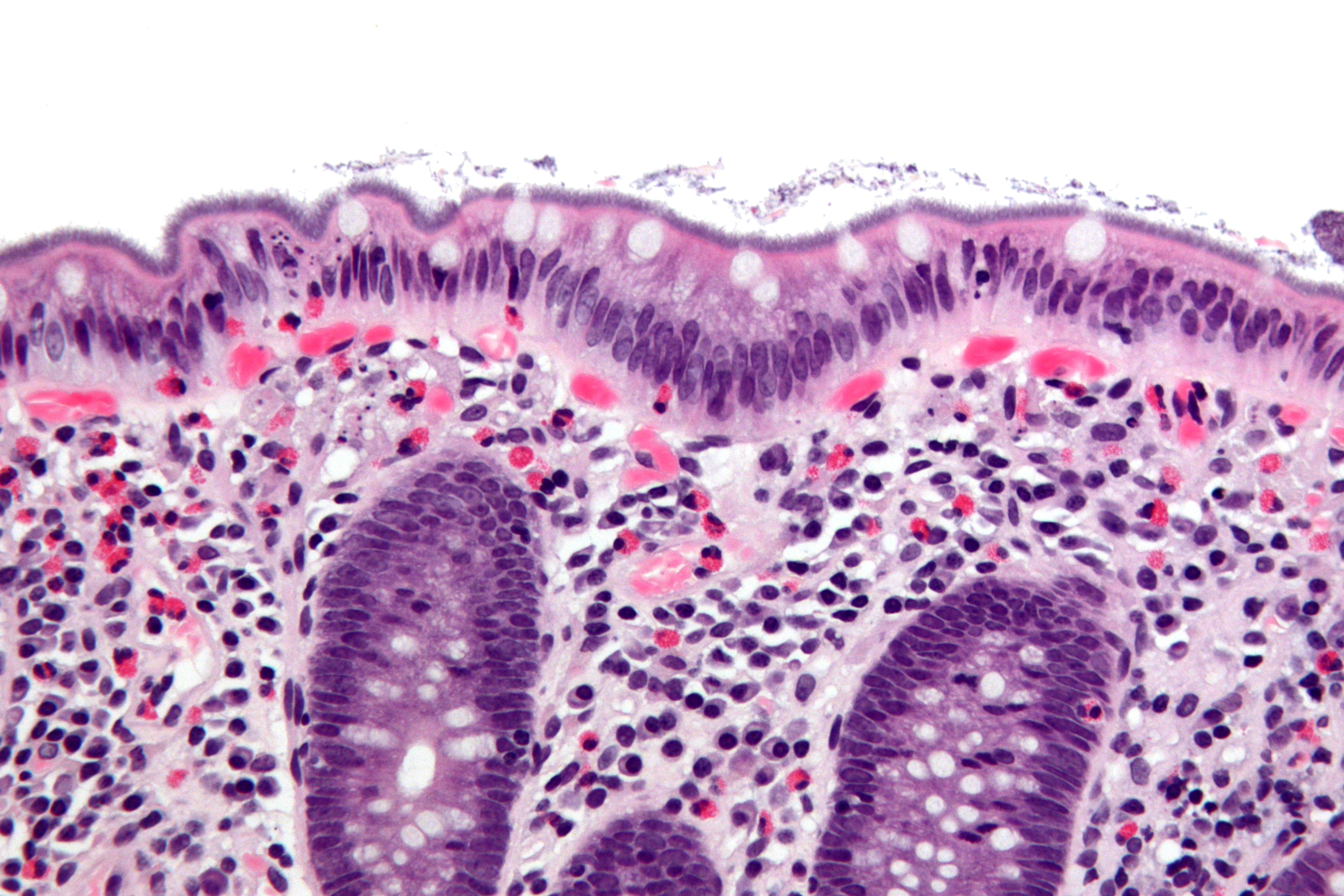
Intestinal spirochetosis. Spirochetes disrupt absorption in the intestine by attaching to the surface of colonic enterocytes.

B. pilosicoli attaches in an end-on manner to the mucosal epithelium of the large intestine and interferes with water absorption in the GI tract. This end-on attachment creates the appearance of a "false brush border" and is a common feature of spirochetosis in all animal species. Inflammation of the mucosa due to spirochete attachment may lead to a thickened mucosa, focal lesions with an exudate of mucus and white blood cells, and dilated colonic crypts. This disruption to the colonic enterocytes and associated microvilli causes the symptoms of diarrhea and slow growth that are characteristic of intestinal spirochetosis.

However, there may be variability in the characteristics of colonization and severity of infection in different individuals and between species, such as purely end-on attachment with microvilli disruption in some compared to invasion and destruction of enterocytes in others. Originally thought to be non-invasive in humans, attaching to just the luminal surface of the intestinal mucosa, more recent studies have found that there can be cell destruction associated with intestinal spirochetosis. Diet may also play a role in the variability of the degree of colonization, and disease can vary from subclinical to severe. Cases of more severe diarrhea are associated with a heavier spirochete burden, increased cell destruction, and blunted microvilli.

In general, the virulence factors within the genus Brachyspira are thought to be involved primarily in chemotaxis and motility, adherence and invasion, and hemolysis. Lipooligosaccharides in the cell wall may be associated with mucosal inflammation, though Brachyspira species do not have any genes that encode adhesins or toxins. B. pilosicoli is known to have flagella that facilitate penetration of mucus and interaction with the host enterocytes. Although virulence factors specific to B. pilosicoli have not been extensively characterized, various surface proteins have been identified that are known to be linked to virulence in other bacterial species. These include proteins involved in chemotaxis and motility, hemolysins involved in damage to enterocytes and subsequent inflammation, and ankyrin-like proteins that allow for the interaction of bacteria with host cells.

== Disease ==
=== Swine ===
Brachyspira pilosicoli is one of the causative agents of porcine intestinal spirochetosis. The disease is seen most frequently during times of stress such as during weaning and mixing. Pigs suffering from intestinal spirochetosis have characteristic diarrhea with loose, watery feces often described as having a wet cement appearance. Other clinical signs include reduced productivity, hemorrhagic colitis, and bloody or mucoid diarrhea. Diarrhea typically resolves quickly but may persist in some animals. On post-mortem, the large intestine may be enlarged and have a thickened mucosa. The decreased feed intake and body weight gain associated with the disease cause significant economic impacts for producers. The most common sources of infection include contaminated pens, feed and water, as well as contaminated personnel and equipment.

=== Poultry ===
In poultry, infection with Brachyspira pilosicoli causes avian intestinal spirochetosis. The disease occurs most frequently in laying hens and breeding flocks. Birds are at risk of colonization with Brachyspira pilosicoli starting around 15 weeks of age, and their risk increases with age. Therefore, due to the young age of the birds, it is unlikely to see avian intestinal spirochetosis in broiler chickens and in hatcheries. Clinical signs of the disease include severe watery diarrhea and reduced productivity. In laying hens, avian intestinal spirochetosis results in decreased egg production, delayed onset of egg production, eggs stained with feces, reduced egg quality, and increased mortality. Chicks hatched from hens colonized with Brachyspira pilosicoli have reduced growth rates and experience wet feces. Transmission occurs most commonly from contact with wildlife or other domestic animals carrying the bacteria, as well as from contaminated people or equipment. Avian intestinal spirochetosis has been reported globally, with prevalence varying by region. Colonization with Brachyspira pilosicoli has been shown to produce similar clinical disease in other poultry species such as turkeys and ducks.

=== Humans ===
Clinical infection with Brachyspira pilosicoli in humans is uncommon but has been associated with colonic spirochetosis, also termed intestinal spirochetosis. The prevalence of infection is highest in developing countries. Conditions of poverty and unhygienic environments are predisposing factors for infection. Epidemiological data from developing countries indicate that the prevalence of colonization ranges from 11 to 25%. In developed countries, identification of Brachyspira pilosicoli colonization is often an incidental finding on rectal biopsy or colonoscopy. Immunocompromised individuals, individuals living with HIV and homosexual men have an increased risk of infection. The majority of human infections with Brachyspira pilosicoli are asymptomatic. Symptomatic infections are characterized by diarrhea, headaches, bloating, cramping, rectal bleeding and colitis. Treatment for 10 days with co-amoxicillin 1 g twice daily and metronidazole 500 mg thrice daily seems to have good results on abdominal symptoms.

== Zoonotic potential ==
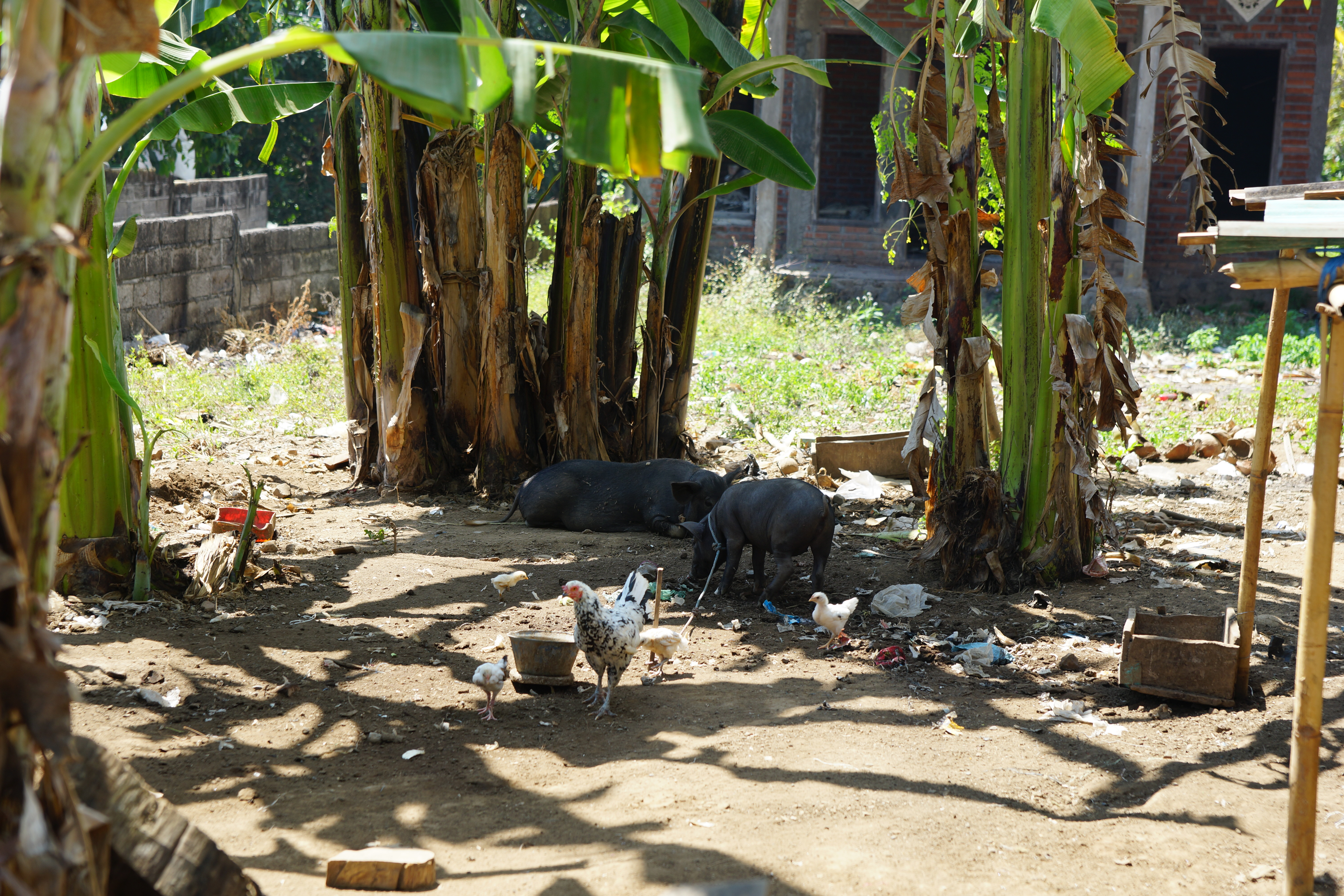
Opportunities for interspecies transmission of B. pilosicoli are more likely to occur in households where animals and humans live in close proximity.

Interspecies transmission of B. pilosicoli has been demonstrated; zoonotic transmission is highly likely, although it has not been conclusively shown. Several studies that have isolated B. pilosicoli from fecal carriage have identified environmental factors that may be important in transmission. Specifically, the spirochete is passed in feces and may survive for prolonged periods in natural water systems such as lakes and ponds, from which it can be isolated. Therefore, it is presumed that infection occurs in humans via the oral route following exposure to infected fecal material of either human or animal origin. Colonization of the intestinal tract and consequential spirochetosis, the presence of spirochetes forming a dense fringe or brush border on the colonic epithelium, is more commonly described. Incidences of blood-borne infection have been observed; however, cases of spirochetemia with B. pilosicoli are relatively uncommon. The incidence of intestinal colonization with B. pilosicoli and consequential spirochaetosis is associated with crowded and unhygienic conditions in developing countries. As a consequence of the spirochete's ability to survive for long periods in stagnant water, there is conclusive evidence that suggests contaminated water sources may account for the high rates of intestinal carriage with B. pilosicoli found in developing communities. Studies investigating the prevalence of B. pilosicoli in human fecal carriage in Latin America demonstrate that human colonization with B. pilosicoli is significantly more common in individuals living in villages than in those living in an urban area. Specifically, if hygiene in a village is poor due to lack of modern sanitation and reliance on nearby streams as a sole source of water, the fecal-oral transmission of B. pilosicoli is favored. Similarly, the prevalence of B. pilosicoli in human fecal carriage is greater in crowded peri-urban areas that contain pigs and other animal species, where water is collected from shallow wells rather than having a supply of clean tap water as seen in urban areas. Opportunities for interspecies transmission of B. pilosicoli are more likely to occur in households where animals and humans live in close proximity, thus individuals working with intensively farmed pigs, chickens, or other farmed species may be at increased risk of exposure. In addition, it has been suggested that B. pilosicoli can survive meat processing and thus serves as a potential risk to consumers via contaminated raw meat. Largely as a consequence of the considerable genetic similarities between strains of B. pilosicoli infecting humans, swine, and poultry, the potential to adapt to various hosts exists.

Human case reports of B. pilosicoli spirochaetosis have been described, suggesting that individuals colonized with B. pilosicoli may develop focal colitis and chronic diarrhea, with abdominal pain, flatulence, gastrointestinal bleeding, rectal discharge, watery diarrhea, and pseudoappendicitis. Colonoscopic examination often reveals a normal-appearing mucosa. However, edematous and erythematous mucosal changes have been reported. Following the apparition of any symptoms, intestinal spirochaetosis is confirmed by biopsy. Overall, human intestinal spirochaetosis with B. pilosicoli is relatively uncommon and there is a debate regarding its clinical significance as most cases are asymptomatic. Incidence of colonization is associated with crowded and unhygienic conditions in developing countries and in specific populations such as Australian Aborigines, as well as amongst homosexual males and HIV+ patients in western countries. Of those already colonized, spirochetemia has been observed in individuals with impaired immune defenses or injury of the gastrointestinal mucosa. Further evidence of B. pilosicoli pathogenicity includes human cases of invasive hepatic infection and hepatitis in chronically ill or immunocompromised individuals where the spirochetemia is likely to have been secondary to the immunosuppression. These cases are likely examples of human infections of pathogenic B. pilosicoli from enteric commensal populations as a consequence of increased microorganism virulence or diminished host defenses. It remains unclear as to what extent spirochetemia may contribute to clinical signs in these patients, although some patients have shown multiorgan failure. Nevertheless, spirochetemia also appears to be a relatively rare phenomenon in individuals where fecal carriage has been observed.

== See also ==
Intestinal spirochetosis
