= Antibiotic use in livestock =

Use of antibiotics for any purpose in the husbandry of livestock

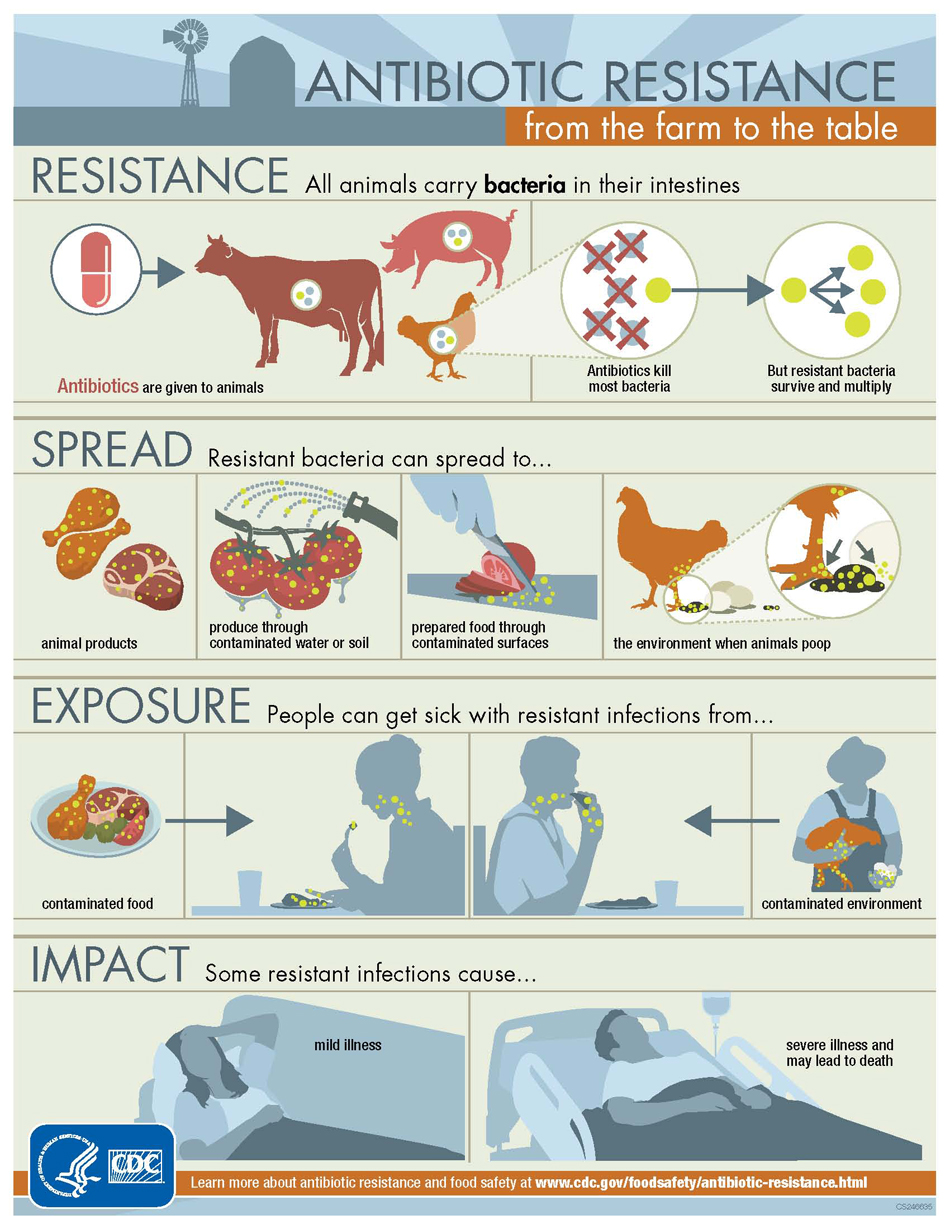
A CDC infographic on how antibiotic-resistant bacteria have the potential to spread from farm animals

The use of antibiotics in the husbandry of livestock includes treatment when ill (therapeutic), treatment of a group of animals when at least one is diagnosed with clinical infection (metaphylaxis), and preventative treatment (prophylaxis). Antibiotics are an important tool to treat animal as well as human disease, safeguard animal health and welfare, and support food safety. However, used irresponsibly, this may lead to antibiotic resistance which may impact human, animal and environmental health.

While levels of use vary dramatically from country to country, for example some Northern European countries use very low quantities to treat animals compared with humans, worldwide an estimated 73% of antimicrobials (mainly antibiotics) are consumed by farm animals. Furthermore, a 2015 study also estimates that global agricultural antibiotic usage will increase by 67% from 2010 to 2030, mainly from increases in use in developing BRIC countries.

Increased antibiotic use is a matter of concern as antibiotic resistance is considered to be a serious threat to human and animal welfare in the future, and growing levels of antibiotics or antibiotic-resistant bacteria in the environment could increase the numbers of drug-resistant infections in both. Bacterial diseases are a leading cause of death and a future without effective antibiotics would fundamentally change the way modern human as well as veterinary medicine is practised.

Legislation and other curbs on antibiotic use in farm animals are now being introduced across the globe. In 2017, the World Health Organization strongly suggested reducing antibiotic use in animals used in the food industry. The use of antibiotics for growth promotion purposes was banned in the European Union from 2006, and the use of sub-therapeutic doses of medically important antibiotics in animal feed and water to promote growth and improve feed efficiency became illegal in the United States on 1 January 2017, through regulatory change enacted by the Food and Drug Administration (FDA), which sought voluntary compliance from drug manufacturers to re-label their antibiotics.

== History ==
The 2018 book 'Pharming animals: a global history of antibiotics in food production (1935–2017)' summarises the central role antibiotics have played in agriculture: "Since their advent during the 1930s, antibiotics have not only had a dramatic impact on human medicine, but also on food production. On farms, whaling and fishing fleets as well as in processing plants and aquaculture operations, antibiotics were used to treat and prevent disease, increase feed conversion, and preserve food. Their rapid diffusion into nearly all areas of food production and processing was initially viewed as a story of progress on both sides of the Iron Curtain."

To retrace, while natural antibiotics or antibacterials were known to ancient man, antibiotics came to the fore during World War II to help treat war time casualties. It is recorded that antibiotics were first used in farming towards the end of the war, in the form of intra-mammary penicillin preparations to treat bovine mastitis. At that time, milk was seen as an agricultural product which was highly susceptible to bacterial contamination, and farmers welcomed the opportunity to 'purify' their produce for the safety of consumers; it was only later that concern switched from the bacterial load of the product to the residues that might result from untimely or unregulated treatment.

The use of antibiotics to treat and prevent disease has followed a similar path to that used in human medicine in terms of therapeutic and metaphylactic applications to treat and manage disease and improve population health, and the application of case-by-case strategic preventative treatments when animals are deemed at particular risk. However, in the late 1940s, studies examining the supplementation of B12 in chicks' diets found that B12 produced from the fermentation of Streptomyces aureofaciens, an antibiotic for use in human medicine, produced a better weight gain for chicks than B12 supplied from other sources, and a reduced amount of feed to bring the birds to market weight. Further studies on other livestock species showed a similar improved growth and feed efficiency effect with the result that as the cost of antibiotics came down, they were increasingly included at low ('sub-therapeutic') levels in livestock feed as a means of increasing production of affordable animal protein to meet the needs of a rapidly-expanding post-war population. This development coincided with an increase in the scale of individual farms and the level of confinement of the animals on them, and so routine preventative antibiotic treatments became the most cost-effective means of treating the anticipated disease that could sometimes arise as a result. Veterinary medicine increasingly embraced the therapeutic, metaphylactic and strategic preventative use of antibiotics to treat disease. The routine use of antibiotics for growth stimulation and disease prevention also grew.

Antibiotic usage in the UK has been banned since 2006 – however in 2017, 73% of all antibiotics sold globally were used in animals for food production.

== Growth stimulation ==
In 1910 in the United States, a meat shortage resulted in protests and boycotts. After this and other shortages, the public demanded government research into stabilization of food supplies. Since the 1900s, livestock production on United States farms has reared larger quantities of animals over a short period of time which has helped to meet consumer demand. It was discovered in the 1940s that feeding subtherapeutic levels of antibiotics improved feed efficiency and accelerated animal growth. Following this discovery, American Cyanamid published research establishing the practice of using antibiotic growth promoters. By 2001, this practice had grown so much that a report by the Union of Concerned Scientists found that nearly 90% of the total use of antimicrobials in the United States was for non-therapeutic purposes in agricultural production. Certain antibiotics, when given in low, subtherapeutic doses, are known to improve feed conversion efficiency (more output, such as muscle or milk, for a given amount of feed) and may promote greater growth, most likely by affecting gut flora. The drugs listed below can be used to increase feed conversion ratio and weight gain, but are not legally allowed to be used for such purposes any longer in the United States. Some drugs listed below are ionophores, which are coccidiostats and not classified as antibiotics in many countries; they have not been shown to increase risk of antibiotic-resistant infections in humans.

Antibiotic Growth Promoters historically used in Livestock Production in some countries
Drug	Class	Livestock
Bacitracin	Peptide	Beef cattle, chickens, swine, and turkeys; promotes egg production in chickens
Bambermycin		Beef cattle, chickens, swine, and turkeys.
Carbadox		Swine
Colistin		Swine
Laidlomycin		Beef cattle
Lasalocid	Ionophore	Beef cattle
Lincomycin		Chickens and swine
Monensin	Ionophore	Beef cattle and sheep; promotes milk production in dairy cows
Neomycin/ Oxytetracycline		Beef cattle, chickens, swine, and turkeys
Penicillin		Chickens, swine, and turkeys
Roxarsone		Chickens and turkeys
Salinomycin	Ionophore	
Tylosin		Chickens and swine
Virginiamycin	Peptide	Beef cattle, chickens, swine, turkeys

The practice of using antibiotics for growth stimulation has been deemed problematic for these following reasons:

- It is the largest use of antimicrobials worldwide
- Subtherapeutic use of antibiotics results in bacterial resistance
- Every important class of antibiotics are being used in this way, making every class less effective
- The bacteria being changed harm humans

== Antibiotic resistance ==
=== Genetic Basis of Antibiotic Resistance ===
Antibiotic resistance is a subset of antimicrobial resistance (AMR) through which bacteria develop mechanisms to withstand insults such as antibiotics which are meant to kill. AMR refers to resistance by all microbes including viruses, fungi, parasites and bacteria to medicine. This is a growing matter of concern as antibiotic resistance is considered to be a serious future threat to human welfare. AMR is increasing in both developed and developing countries. If this trend continues without adequate intervention, the result may be infectious disease with no cure and vaccines.

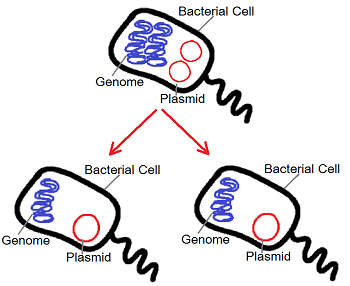
Bacterial conjugation

Bacteria from the same ecological niche as antibiotic-producing organisms have evolved ancient mechanisms to withstand the effect of the harmful antibiotics. Bacteria are still able to thrive in the presence of many environmental threats, including antibiotics. This unique ability is referred to as genetic plasticity. Bacteria have two mechanism by which their genetics information can be altered to make them more resistant to threats - either by the mutation of their genes or by the acquisition of foreign DNA, which code for resistant genes. The latter being the most important cause of antibiotic-resistant strains of bacteria in animals and humans. Bacteria may acquire these foreign genes through three processes: transformation, transduction and conjugation.

Transformation is the process by which bacteria acquire naked DNA from the environment. In transduction, bacteria acquire DNA from viruses via bacteriophages. Conjugation is the direct transfer of DNA through cell-to-cell contact which is often mediated by plasmids. Conjugative plasmids carry a number of beneficial genes and enable bacteria to exchange them among themselves to improve survival against antibiotics. This contributes to multi-drug resistant bacteria.

Antibiotic resistance also occurs naturally, as it is a bacterium's response to any threat. Antibiotic-resistant bacteria have been found in pristine environments unrelated to human activity such as in the frozen and uncovered remains of woolly mammoths, in the polar ice caps and in isolated caves deep underground. Antibiotic resistance can occurs if the bioavailability of antibiotics are too low to inhibit bacterial growth, which can trigger cellular responses in the bacteria that allow them to survive. These bacteria can then reproduce and spread their antibiotic-resistant genes to other generations, increasing their prevalence and ultimately leading to infections that cannot be healed by antibiotics.

=== High priority antibiotics ===
The World Health Organization (WHO) published a revised list in 2019 of 'Critically Important Antimicrobials for Human Medicine, 6th revision' with the intent that it be used "as a reference to help formulate and prioritize risk assessment and risk management strategies for containing antimicrobial resistance" due to human and non-human antimicrobial use to help preserve the effectiveness of currently available antimicrobials. It lists its Highest Priority Critically Important Antimicrobials as: 3rd, 4th and 5th generation cephalosporins, glycopeptides, macrolides and ketolides, polymyxins including colistin, and quinolones including fluoroqinolones.

The European Medicines Agency (EMA) Antimicrobial Advice Ad Hoc Expert Group (AMEG) also published an updated categorisation of different antibiotics in veterinary medicine by the antibiotic resistance risk to humans of using them alongside the need to treat disease in animals for health and welfare reasons. The categorisation specifically focuses on the situation in Europe. Category A ('Avoid') antibiotics are designated as 'not appropriate for use in food producing animals'. Category B ('Restrict') products, also known as Highest Priority Critically Important Antibiotics, are only to be used as a last resort. These include quinolones (such as fluoroquinolones), 3rd and 4th generation cephalosporins, and polymyxins, including colistin. A new intermediate Category C ('Caution') has been created for antibiotics which should be used when there is no available product in Category D ('Prudence') that would be clinically effective. Category C includes macrolides and aminoglycosides, with the exception of spectinomycin, which remains in Category D.

Evidence for the transfer of macrolide-resistant microorganisms from animals to humans has been scant, and most evidence shows that pathogens of concern in human populations originated in humans and are maintained there, with rare cases of transference to humans. Macrolides are also extremely useful in the effective treatment of some Mycoplasma species in poultry, Lawsonia in pigs, respiratory tract infections in cattle and in some circumstances, lameness in sheep.

=== Sources of antibiotic resistance ===
While the human medical use of antibiotics is the main source of antibiotic resistant infections in humans, it is known that humans can acquire antibiotic resistance genes from a variety of animal sources, including farm animals, pets and wildlife. Much of this antibiotic resistance is sourced from the overuse of antibiotics in farm animals. Three potential mechanisms by which agricultural antibiotic use could lead to human disease have been identified as: 1 - direct infection with resistant bacteria from an animal source; 2 - breaches in the species barrier followed by sustained transmission in humans of resistant strains arising in livestock; 3 - transfer of resistance genes from agriculture into human pathogens. While there is evidence of transmission of resistance from animals to humans in all three cases, either the scale is limited or causality is hard to establish. As Chang et al. (2014) state: "The topic of agricultural antibiotic use is complex. As we noted ... many believe that agricultural antibiotics have become a critical threat to human health. While the concern is not unwarranted, the extent of the problem may be exaggerated. There is no evidence that agriculture is 'largely to blame' for the increase in resistant strains and we should not be distracted from finding adequate ways to ensure appropriate antibiotic use in all settings, the most important of which being clinical medicine."

The future of antibiotic use in livestock heavily relies on the coordination between local governments and workers in the agricultural sector . The Livestock Biomass Conversion (LBC) method is a novel technique to observe antibiotic use within livestock species and track intensity of antibiotic usage. This assessment model ideally will assist in sustainable reduction of antibiotic resistance in livestock.

== Health issues ==
The use of antibiotics in livestock is widely recognized as a health issue, reflecting the interconnected nature of human, animal, and environmental health. Antibiotic use in food-producing animals contributes to the development and spread of antimicrobial resistance (AMR), which can affect multiple biological systems and pathways.

=== Human health implications ===
Antibiotic-resistant bacteria originating in livestock can be transmitted to humans through several routes, including the consumption of contaminated food products, direct contact with animals, and environmental exposure. Resistant pathogens such as Salmonella, Campylobacter, and certain strains of Escherichia coli have been associated with livestock production and can cause infections in humans that are more difficult to treat. The transfer of resistance genes between bacteria further complicates control efforts, as it allows resistance to spread beyond specific species or environments.

=== Animal health and agricultural practices ===
Antibiotics are used in livestock to treat, prevent, and control disease, and in some regions to promote growth. While these practices can improve animal health and productivity, their widespread or inappropriate use can accelerate the emergence of resistant microorganisms within animal populations. This creates challenges for veterinary medicine, as infections in animals may become harder to manage over time, potentially affecting animal welfare and food security.

=== Environmental pathways ===
The environment plays a significant role in the dissemination of antimicrobial resistance. Antibiotics and resistant bacteria can enter soil and water systems through animal waste, agricultural runoff, and wastewater. These substances may persist in the environment, promoting the development and exchange of resistance genes among environmental microbial communities. Environmental reservoirs can, in turn, serve as sources of resistant bacteria that re-enter human and animal populations.

=== Integrated approaches and policy responses ===
Addressing antibiotic use in livestock requires coordinated, interdisciplinary strategies that reflect the principles of One Health. International organizations such as the World Health Organization (WHO), the Food and Agriculture Organization (FAO), and the World Organisation for Animal Health (WOAH) have called for the reduction of non-therapeutic antibiotic use in animals, improved surveillance of antimicrobial use and resistance, and the implementation of stewardship programs. These efforts aim to balance the need for animal health and agricultural productivity with the protection of public and environmental health.

==== Direct contact with animals ====
In terms of direct infection with resistant bacteria from an animals source, studies have shown that direct contact with livestock can lead to the spread of antibiotic-resistant bacteria. The risk appears greatest in those handling or managing livestock, for example in a study where resistant bacteria were monitored in farm labourers and neighbours after chickens receiving an antibiotic in their feed. Manure may also contain antibiotic-resistant Staphylococcus aureus bacteria which can infect humans. In 2017, the WHO included methicillin-resistant S. aureus (MRSA) in its priority list of 12 antibiotic-resistant bacteria, urging the need to search for new and more effective antibiotics against it. There also has been an increase in the number of bacterial pathogens resistant to multiple antimicrobial agents, including MRSA, which have recently emerged into different lineages. Some of them are associated with livestock and on-farm companion animals that are then able to be transmitted to humans, also called livestock-associated methicillin-resistant Staphylococcus aureus (LA-MRSA). LA-MRSA can be detected in air and soil samples, spreading in barn air and infecting livestock workers. These new lineages can be found on soft tissues of livestock workers, for example in their noses. A study looked at the association between exposure to livestock and the occurrence of LA-MRSA infection and observed that LA-MRSA infection was 9.64 times as likely to be found among livestock workers and veterinarians compared to their unexposed families and community members, showing that exposure to livestock significantly increases the risk of developing MRSA infection. Although total numbers colonised by LA-MRSA remain low, and fewer still develop infection, the condition is nonetheless rising in prevalence, difficult to treat, and has become a public health concern. Therefore, AMR surveillance should be extended, especially since antimicrobial use limitations for livestock are often extended to pets without further justification.

==== Foodborne antibiotic resistance ====
Pathogens present on or in food often expose humans to antibiotic-resistant bacteria. Livestock can carry resistant bacteria, or contamination can occur at any point in food production, be it slaughtering, processing, storage, distribution, or handling. The most common foodborne bacteria species are Campylobacter, Salmonella, E. coli and Listeria. Dairy products, ground minced beef, and poultry are among the most common foods that can harbor pathogens both resistant and susceptible to antibiotics, and surveillance of retail meats such as turkey, chicken, pork, and beef has found Enterobacteriaceae. When resistant bacteria are consumed through food and colonize the gut, they can lead to infections that are both distressing and more challenging to treat if they are resistant to commonly used antibiotics. While some studies have established connections between antibiotic resistant infections and food-producing animals, others have struggled to establish causal links, even when examining plasmid-mediated resistance. Standard precautions such as pasteurising, preparing and cooking meat properly, food preservation methods, and effective hand washing can help eliminate, decrease, and prevent spread of and infection from these and other potentially harmful bacteria.

Environmental borne antibiotic resistance

Humans can also be exposed to antibiotic resistance through environmental factors. Large amounts of antibiotics, typically around 70% and in some instances up to 90% administered to livestock are not absorbed and most often are expelled through urine and manure. This raises issues as that exposure can affect animal, human and environmental health. One study showed that after manure was used as fertilizer, there was a 4-fold increase in the amount of antibiotic resistance genes (ARGs) in the soil. When animal manures are stored inadequately or applied as fertiliser, this can then spread antibiotic-resistant bacteria to crops and into run-off water. Urinary and fecal residues also transfer antibiotic resistance through wastewater, especially on farms, depending on the type and amount of antibiotics administered. Wind can also transport bioaerosols from farms into surrounding environments, especially in winter. Research indicates that this ARG quantity in manure decreases with fermentation time. Composting has also been shown to reduce the presence of various antibiotics by 20–99%, but one study found that chlortetracycline, an antibiotic used in livestock feed in China, degraded at different rates dependent on the animal it was fed to, and that manure composting was not sufficient to ensure the microbial degradation of the antibiotic.

Mechanisms of Resistance

Antimicrobial resistance utilizes several mechanisms to acquire and transfer new genetic material between bacterial species. Transfer of genetic material laterally is referred to as horizontal gene transfer. Initially, conjugation occurs, where bacterial cells transmit genetic information through plasmids directly from the donor to recipient cell, helping bacteria acquire genetic material. This process does not require reproduction. Research indicates that the use of Macrolides and Fluoroquinolones, which are used in treating infections in pigs have been identified to potentially use horizontal gene transfer between species . Continued antibiotic exposure can possibly increase mutation of genetic materials.

==== Other sources of resistance ====
As well as via food, E. coli from a variety of sources can also cause urinary and bloodstream infections. While one study suggests a large proportion of resistant E. coli isolates causing bloodstream infections in people could emanate from livestock produced for food, other studies have since contradicted this, finding little commonality between resistance genes from livestock sources and those found in human infections, even when examining plasmid-mediated resistance.

The use of antibiotics in livestock also has the potential to introduce antibiotic-resistant bacteria to humans via environmental exposure or inhalation of airborne bacteria. Antibiotics given to livestock in sub-therapeutic concentrations to stimulate growth when there is no diagnosis of disease – a practice still permitted in some countries – may kill some, but not all, of the bacterial organisms in the animal, possibly leaving those that are naturally antibiotic-resistant in the environment. Hence the practice of using antibiotics for growth stimulation could result in selection for resistance.

Public Health Impact and Antimicrobial Resistance

The widespread use of antibiotics in livestock is closely linked to the growing threat of antimicrobial resistance (AMR) in humans. When animals are routinely administered antibiotics—particularly for growth promotion or disease prevention—resistant bacteria can develop. These bacteria may spread to humans through several pathways, including the food supply, direct animal contact, and environmental contamination, such as water runoff from farms.

Transmission through foodborne routes is considered especially significant in industrialized countries. Pathogens like Salmonella enterica, Campylobacter jejuni, Campylobacter coli, and Yersinia enterocolitica are typically transmitted via contaminated food. For other resistant bacteria, such as methicillin-resistant Staphylococcus aureus (MRSA), direct contact between humans and animals is the primary mode of transmission.

Additionally, bacteria and antibiotic residues from food-animal production are widely dispersed into the environment, primarily through manure. This environmental contamination affects local microbial communities and wildlife, turning both into potential reservoirs for resistance. These environmental sources can, in turn, reintroduce resistant bacteria back into human and animal populations.

Global health experts have increasingly warned of the serious consequences of AMR. According to Dame Sally Davies, the United Kingdom's Special Envoy on Antimicrobial Resistance, more than 1.2 million people die each year from drug-resistant infections, with antibiotic use in animal agriculture being a significant contributing factor. The Review on Antimicrobial Resistance, chaired by Jim O'Neill, projected that without bold policies, annual deaths from AMR could rise to 10 million by 2050—surpassing current cancer mortality.

The World Health Organization (WHO) supports these projections, estimating that AMR could lead to 10 million deaths annually by 2050 if no action is taken. Currently, at least 700,000 people die each year from drug-resistant infections, including approximately 230,000 deaths from multidrug-resistant tuberculosis. In addition to the health burden, the economic impact of uncontrolled AMR could rival that of the 2008 financial crisis

Recognizing the interconnectedness of human, animal, and environmental health, the WHO and other international bodies emphasize the need for a coordinated "One Health" approach to mitigate the spread of AMR. This strategy calls for global cooperation across sectors to improve antibiotic stewardship, strengthen surveillance systems, and promote sustainable alternatives to antibiotic use in agriculture.

== Global positions on antibiotic use in farm animals ==
In 2017, the World Health Organization (WHO) recommended reducing antibiotic use in animals used in the food industry. Due to the increasing risk of antibiotic resistant bacteria, the WHO strongly suggested restrictions on antibiotics being used for growth promotion and antibiotics used on healthy animals. Animals that require antibiotics should be treated with antibiotics that pose the smallest risk to human health. HSBC also produced a report in October 2018 warning that the use of antibiotics in meat production could have "devastating" consequences for humans. It noted that many dairy and meat producers in Asia and the Americas had an economic incentive to continue high usage of antibiotics, particularly in crowded or unsanitary living conditions.

However, the World Organisation for Animal Health has acknowledged the need to protect antibiotics but argued against a total ban on antibiotic use in animal production. A total ban on antibiotics might drastically reduce protein supply in some parts of the world, and when use of antibiotics is reduced or eliminated in livestock through legislation or voluntarily, both animal health and welfare and economic impacts can be negatively affected. For example, experiences from farms where antibiotic use has been cut back or eliminated in the interests of meeting a consumer demand for 'antibiotic-free' or 'reared without antibiotics' produce have been shown to have a detrimental effect on animal health and welfare. When antibiotics are used sub-therapeutically (for animal performance, increased growth, and improved feed efficiency), then the costs of meat, eggs, and other animal products are lowered. One big argument against the restriction of antibiotic use is the potential economic hardship that would result for producers of livestock and poultry that could also result in higher cost for consumers. In a study analysing the economic cost of the FDA restricting all antibiotic use in animal livestock, it was estimated that the restriction would cost consumers approximately $1.2 billion to $2.5 billion per year. In order to determine the overall economic impact of restricting antibiotic use, the financial cost must be weighed against the health benefits to the population. Since it is difficult to estimate the value of potential health benefits, the study concluded that the complete economic impact of restricting antibiotic use has not yet been determined.

Although quantifying health benefits may be difficult, the economic impact of antibiotic restriction in animals can also be evaluated through the economic impact of antibiotic resistance in humans, which is a significant outcome of antibiotic use in animals. The World Health Organization identifies antibiotic resistance as a contributor to longer hospital stays and higher medical costs. When infections can no longer be treated by typical first-line antibiotics, more expensive medications are required for treatment. When illness duration is extended by antibiotics resistance, the increased health care costs create a larger economic burden for families and societies. The Center for Infectious Disease Research and Policy estimates approximately $2.2 billion in antibiotic resistance- related healthcare costs each year. So while restricting antibiotics in animals causes a significant economic burden, the outcome of antibiotic resistance in humans that is perpetuated by antibiotic use in animals carries comparable economic burdens.

== Use and regulation by country ==
Antibiotic use in livestock world map

Antibiotic use in livestock in europe

Does livestock antibiotic use exceed suggested target? (2010)

The use of medicines to treat disease in food-producing animals is regulated in nearly all countries, although some countries prescription-control their antibiotics, meaning only qualified veterinary surgeons can prescribe and in some cases dispense them. Historically, the restrictions have existed to prevent contamination of mainly meat, milk, eggs and honey with chemicals that are in any way harmful to humans. Treating a sick animal with medicines may lead the animal product containing some of those medicines when the animal is slaughtered, milked, lays eggs or produces honey, unless withdrawal periods are adhered to which stipulate a period of time to ensure the medicines have left the animal's system sufficiently to avoid any risk. Scientific experiments provide data for each medicine in each application, showing how long it is present in the body of an animal and what the animal's body does to metabolise the medicine. By the use of 'drug withdrawal periods' before slaughter or the use of milk or eggs from treated animals, veterinarians and animal owners ensure that the meat, milk and eggs is safe and free of any contamination. However, some countries have also banned or heavily controlled routine use of antibiotics for growth stimulation or the preventative control of disease arising from deficiencies in management or facilities. This is not over concerns about residues, but about the growth of antibiotic resistance.

=== Brazil ===
Brazil is the world's largest exporter of beef. The government regulates antibiotic use in the cattle production industry. The beef cattle industry in Brazil is based on grass-fed animals in which the Nellore breed predominates. The volume of antimicrobials used is not officially published in Brazil. Case studies conducted on farms in Brazil are the only way to get estimates and data of antimicrobial use. National Action Plan on Antimicrobial Resistance in Agriculture was set in place to contain the rise in antimicrobial resistance and limit the use of antibiotics in livestock production. Not all antimicrobials are banned in Brazil; treatment for therapeutic, metaphylactic, and prophylactic reasons are allowed.

=== Canada ===
Because of concerns about antibiotics residues getting into the milk or meat of cattle, the Canadian Food Inspection Agency (CFIA) enforces standards which protect consumers by ensuring that foods produced will not contain antibiotics at a level which will cause harm to consumers. In Canada the veterinary drug regulation consists of two federal government agencies, namely Health Canada and the CFIA, which are responsible for implementing and enforcing the Food and Drugs Act. Testing samples for drug residues include three methods: monitoring, surveillance, and compliance. There are Swab Test On Premises (STOP) procedures to detect antibiotic residues in kidney tissues.

=== China ===
China produces and consumes the most antibiotics of all countries. Antibiotic use has been measured by checking the water near factory farms in China as well as through animal faeces. It was calculated that 38.5 million kg (or 84.9 million lbs) of antibiotics were used in China's swine and poultry production in 2012. The abuse of antibiotics caused severe pollution of soil and surface water in Northern China.

In 2012, U.S. News & World Report described the Chinese government's regulation of antibiotics in livestock production as "weak".

On the UK 5-Year Antimicrobial Resistance (AMR) Strategy 2013–2018, the importance of addressing AMR negative effects on animal health has been considered as same as human health. Several scientific partnerships with low-middle income countries would be established. UK-China Newton fund has started to build multi-discipline collaboration cross the border to stop the increasing global burden caused by AMR. To achieve the goal of citizen public health and food safety, "The National action Plan on Controlling Antibiotic-Resistance Bacteria on animal origins (2016–2020)" has been published by Ministry of Agriculture and Rural Affairs of People's Republic of China since 2017. This plan is fully integrated with the concept of one health. It covers not only the research and development, but also social context.

=== European Union ===
Antibiotic use in livestock in Europe

In 1999, the European Union (EU) implemented an antibiotic resistance monitoring program and a plan to phase out antibiotic use for the purposes of growth promotion by 2006. The European Union banned the use of antibiotics as growth agents starting on 1 January 2006 with Regulation (EC) No 1831/2003. In Germany, 1,734 tons of antimicrobial agents were used for animals in 2011 compared with 800 tons for humans. Sweden was the first country to ban all use of antibiotics as growth promoters in 1986 and played a big role in the EU-wide ban on antimicrobial use by extensive lobbying after joining EU in 1995. Another strategy actively applied in Sweden is prudent usage of antibiotics by performing individual rather than group treatment (on average more than 90% of treatment is individual with tablets, injectables or intramammaries). Denmark started cutting down drastically in 1994, now using 60% less. In the Netherlands, the use of antibiotics to treat diseases increased after the ban on its use for growth purposes in 2006.

In 2011, the European Parliament voted for a non-binding resolution that called for the end of the preventative use of antibiotics in livestock.

A revised regulation on veterinary medicinal products, proposed in procedure 2014/0257/COD, proposed limiting the use of antibiotics in prophylaxis and metaphylaxis. An agreement on the regulation between the Council of the European Union and the European Parliament was confirmed on 13 June 2018, and the new Veterinary Medicines Regulation (Regulation (EU) 2019/6) is due to come into effect on 28 January 2022.

=== India ===
In 2011 the Indian government proposed a "National policy for containment of antimicrobial resistance". Other policies set schedules for requiring that food producing animals not be given antibiotics for a certain amount of time before their food goes to market. A study released by Centre for Science and Environment (CSE) on 30 July 2014 found antibiotic residues in chicken. This study claims that Indians are developing resistance to antibiotics – and hence falling prey to a host of otherwise curable ailments. Some of this resistance might be due to large-scale unregulated use of antibiotics in the poultry industry. CSE finds that India has not set any limits for antibiotic residues in chicken and says that India will have to implement a comprehensive set of regulations including banning of antibiotic use as growth promoters in the poultry industry. Not doing this will put lives of people at risk.

=== New Zealand ===
In 1999 the New Zealand government issued a statement that they would not then ban the use of antibiotics in livestock production. In 2007 ABC Online reported on antibiotic use in chicken production in New Zealand. In 2017, New Zealand published a new action plan to address the ongoing concern of antimicrobial resistance (AMR). The action plan outlined five objectives with each objective looking both at AMR in humans and AMR in agriculture. Compared to other countries, New Zealand has a very low prevalence of AMR in animals and plants. This is due to their low use of antibiotics in animal treatment.

=== South Korea ===
In 1998 some researchers reported use in livestock production was a factor in the high prevalence of antibiotic-resistant bacteria in Korea. In 2007 The Korea Times noted that Korea has relatively high usage of antibiotics in livestock production. In 2011, the Korean government banned the use of antibiotics as growth promoters in livestock.

=== United Kingdom ===
As with other countries in Europe, use of antibiotics for growth promotion was banned in 2006. Less than one third of all antibiotics sold in the UK are now estimated to be used to treat or prevent disease in farmed animals, following a revision to the 2017 sales data published by the UK Government's Veterinary Medicines Directorate. Furthermore, 2018 sales data estimated use at 29.5 mg antibiotics per kg of animal at time of treatment during that year. This represents a 53% reduction in sales of antibiotics to treat food-producing animals over five years. The reduction has largely been achieved without legislation, and has been credited to voluntary industry action coordinated by the Responsible Use of Medicines in Agriculture (RUMA) Alliance through a 'Targets Task Force' comprising a prominent veterinary surgeon and farmer from each livestock enterprise. A European comparison of 2017 sales data found the UK had the fifth lowest sales in Europe during that year, with 2018 comparisons due to be released towards the end of 2020.

While sales data give an overview of levels of use, products are often licensed for use in many species and therefore it is not possible to determine levels of use in different species without more specific usage data from each sector. In 2011, British Poultry Council members, representing 90% of the UK poultry meat industry, formed a stewardship programme that started recording antibiotics used to treat birds in the poultry meat sector in 2012. The first report was published in 2016 and reported a 44% reduction in antibiotic use between 2012 and 2015. Since then, the organisation has produced three further reports, with the 2019 report confirming that the sector is maintaining reductions of over 80% in total use since it started its stewardship group, as well as reducing use of Highest Priority Critically Important Antibiotics by over 80% by stopping use of 3rd and 4th generation cephalosporins in 2012 and colistin in 2016, and only using macrolides and fluoroquinolones as a last resort. Preventative use of antibiotics has also stopped.

As many products are licensed for use in poultry and pigs, the increasing transparency around use in the UK poultry meat sector motivated the UK pig sector to set up a stewardship programme in 2016 through the National Pig Association. In 2017, an electronic Medicine Book for pigs (eMB-Pigs) was launched by levy body Agriculture and Horticulture Development Board. eMB-Pigs provides a centralised electronic version of the existing paper or electronic medicine book kept on farms, and allows pig producers to record and quantify their individual use of medicines for easy review with the veterinary surgeon, at the same time as capturing use on each farm so that data can be collated to provide national usage figures. After it became a requirement of Red Tractor farm assurance for pigs that annual, aggregated records of antibiotic use must be logged on the eMB system, data released May 2018 showed that according to records covering 87% of the UK slaughter pig population, antibiotic use had halved between 2015 and 2017, Data for 2018 confirms that overall antibiotic use in the UK pig sector fell further, by 60% from the estimated 2015 figure, to 110 mg/kg. Use of Highest Priority Critically Important Antibiotics also fell to 0.06 mg/kg, a reduction of 95% from 2015, with use of colistin almost nil.

Factors such as levels of infectious disease domestically or internationally, weather and vaccine availability can all affect antibiotic use. For example, the Scottish salmon farming sector worked with Government and researchers to introduce a vaccine for the disease Furunculosis (Aeromonas salmonicida) in 1994, which significantly reduced the need for antibiotic treatments, but the trout sector is still without an effective vaccine for this disease. Lack of data can also make it difficult for farmers to know they compare with their peers or what they need to focus on, a particular problem for the sheep and cattle sectors in the UK, which are in the process of trying to set up their own electronic medicines hub to capture data.

=== United States ===
In 1970 the FDA first recommended that antibiotic use in livestock be limited but set no actual regulations governing this recommendation. By 2001, the Union of Concerned Scientists estimated that more than 70% of the antibiotics consumed in the US were given to food animals (for example, chickens, pigs, and cattle), in the absence of disease.

In 2004 the Government Accountability Office (GAO) heavily critiqued the FDA for not collecting enough information and data on antibiotic use in factory farms. From this, the GAO concluded the FDA did not have enough information to create effective policy changes regarding antibiotic use. In response, the FDA said more research was being conducted and voluntary efforts within the industry would solve the problem of antibiotic resistance. However, by 2011, a total of 13.6 million kg (30 million lb) of antimicrobials were sold for use in food-producing animals in the United States, which represented 80% of all antibiotics sold or distributed in the United States.

In March 2012, the United States District Court for the Southern District of New York, ruling in an action brought by the Natural Resources Defense Council and others, ordered the FDA to revoke approvals for the use of antibiotics in livestock that violated FDA regulations. On 11 April 2012 the FDA announced a voluntary program to phase out unsupervised use of drugs as feed additives and convert approved over-the-counter uses for antibiotics to prescription use only, requiring veterinarian supervision of their use and a prescription. In December 2013, the FDA announced the commencement of these steps to phase out the use of antibiotics for the purposes of promoting livestock growth.

In 2015, the FDA approved a new Veterinary Feed Directive (VFD), an updated guideline giving instructions to pharmaceutical companies, veterinarians and producers about how to administer necessary drugs through the animal's feed and water. Around the same time, the FDA published a report of antibiotics sold or distributed for food-producing animals which found that between 2009 and 2013, just over 60% were "medically important" drugs also used in humans; the rest were from drug classes like ionophores, which are not used in human medicine. Following this, the FDA asked drug companies to voluntarily edit its labels to exclude growth promotion as an indication for antibiotic usage. It subsequently reports that "Under Guidance for Industry (GFI) #213, which went into effect January 1, 2017, antibiotics that are important for human medicine can no longer be used for growth promotion or feed efficiency in cows, pigs, chickens, turkeys, and other food animals." These new 2017 guidelines for instance prohibited using a drug off-label for non-therapeutic purposes, which would make using the re-labeled drug for growth enhancement illegal. In addition, some drugs were reclassified from 'Over the Counter' (OTC) to 'Veterinary Feed Directive' (VFD); VFD drugs require a veterinarian's authorization before they can be delivered in feed. As a result, the FDA reported a 33% decrease from 2016 to 2017 in domestic sales of medically important antibiotics for use in livestock. Despite this progress, the Natural Resources Defense Council (NRDC) remains concerned that sales of antibiotics to the beef and pork industries remain elevated in 2017 compared with the poultry industries, and their use could still primarily be for preventing diseases in healthy animals, which further increases the threat on antibiotic resistance. However, the FDA policy remains the same as it stated in 2013:

The key aspect of FDA's strategy is the request that animal drug sponsors (those who own the right to market the product) voluntarily work with FDA to revise the approved use conditions for their medically important antimicrobial drug products to remove production uses (such as growth enhancement or feed efficiency), and bring the remaining therapeutic uses under veterinary oversight. Once manufacturers voluntarily make these changes, products can no longer be used for production purposes and therapeutic use of these products would require veterinary oversight.

Because of concerns about antibiotics residues getting into the milk or meat of cattle, in the United States, the government requires a withdraw period for any animal treated with antibiotics before it can be slaughtered, to allow residue to exit the animal.

Some grocery stores have policies about antibiotic use in the animal whose produce they sell. In response to consumer concerns about the use of antibiotics in poultry, Perdue removed all human antibiotics from its feed in 2007 and launched the Harvestland brand, under which it sold products that met the requirements for an "antibiotic-free" label. In 2012 in the United States advocacy organization Consumers Union organized a petition asking the store Trader Joe's to discontinue the sale of meat produced with antibiotics.

- Gore, Al (2013). "The Reinvention of Life and Death: Antibiotics before Swine". The Future: Six Drivers of Global Change (First ed.). New York: Random House. pp. 227 and citation on 475. ISBN 978-0-8129-9294-6.
- Hurd, Scott (26 June 2012). "Commentary: 'Meat without Drugs' could be inhumane". Bovine Veterinarian. "All peer-reviewed scientific risk assessments have demonstrated a negligible risk of human health harm due to livestock antibiotic use."
- Greenaway, Twilight (20 June 2012). "Your meat on drugs: Will grocery stores cut out antibiotics?". Grist. By 2014, Perdue had also phased out ionophores from its hatchery and began using "antibiotic free" labels on some products, and by 2015, 52% of the company's chickens were raised without the use of any type of antibiotics.

The CDC and FDA do not now support the use of antibiotics for growth promotion because of evidence suggesting that antibiotics used for growth promotion purposes could lead to the development of resistant bacteria. In addition to this, The Pew Charitable Trusts has stated that "hundreds of scientific studies conducted over four decades demonstrate that feeding low doses of antibiotics to livestock breeds antibiotic-resistant superbugs that can infect people". The FDA, the U.S. Department of Agriculture and the Centers for Disease Control and Prevention have all testified before Congress that there is a definitive link between the routine, non-therapeutic use of antibiotics in food animal production and the challenge of antibiotic resistance in humans." However, the National Pork Board, a government-owned corporation of the United States, has said: "The vast majority of producers use (antibiotics) appropriately." In 2011 the National Pork Producers Council, an American trade association, also said, "Not only is there no scientific study linking antibiotic use in food animals to antibiotic resistance in humans, as the US pork industry has continually pointed out, but there isn't even adequate data to conduct a study." The statement was issued in response to a United States Government Accountability Office report that asserts: "Antibiotic use in food animals contributes to the emergence of resistant bacteria that may affect humans".

It is difficult to set up a comprehensive surveillance system for measuring rates of change in antibiotic resistance. The US Government Accountability Office published a report in 2011 stating that government and commercial agencies had not been collecting sufficient data to make a decision about best practices. There is also no regulatory agency in the United States that systematically collects detailed data on antibiotic use in humans and animals, which means it is not clear which antibiotics are prescribed for which purpose and at what time. While this may be lacking at a regulatory level, the US poultry meat sector has been working on the issue of data collection itself, and has now reported comparative data showing significant reductions in antibiotic use. Among the highlights in the report was a 95% decrease in in-feed tetracycline use in broiler chicks from 2013 to 2017, a 67% reduction in in-feed use of tetracycline in turkeys, and a 42% drop in hatchery use of gentamicin in turkey poults.

In 2022, one group of researchers looked at cattle lots marketed as "raised without antibiotics" to see how often antibiotic residues showed up. They found around 15% of lots had at least one test showing signs of antibiotics. In 2023, the USDA Food Safety and Inspection Service conducted a study finding 20% of cattle marketed as "raised without antibiotics" contained antibiotic residues.

== Research into alternatives ==
Global antibiotic use in livestock under reduction scenarios

Increasing concern due to the emergence of antibiotic-resistant bacteria has led researchers to look for alternatives to using antibiotics in livestock.

Probiotics, cultures of a single bacteria strain or mixture of different strains, are being studied in livestock as a production enhancer.

Prebiotics are non-digestible carbohydrates. The carbohydrates are mainly made up of oligosaccharides which are short chains of monosaccharides. The two most commonly studied prebiotics are fructooligosaccharides (FOS) and mannanoligosaccharides (MOS). FOS has been studied for use in chicken feed. MOS works as a competitive binding site, as bacteria bind to it rather than the intestine and are carried out.

Bacteriophages are able to infect most bacteria and are easily found in most environments colonized by bacteria, and have been studied as well.

In another study it was found that using probiotics, competitive exclusion, enzymes, immunomodulators and organic acids prevents the spread of bacteria and can all be used in place of antibiotics. Another research team was able to use bacteriocins, antimicrobial peptides and bacteriophages in the control of bacterial infections. While further research is needed in this field, alternative methods have been identified in effectively controlling bacterial infections in animals.

Other alternatives include preventative approaches to keep the animals healthier and so reduce the need for antibiotics. These include improving the living conditions for animals, stimulating natural immunity through better nutrition, increasing biosecurity, implementing better management and hygiene practices, and ensuring better use of vaccination.

== See also ==
- Antibiotic misuse
- Antimicrobial resistance
- Antibiotics in poultry farming in America
- Subtherapeutic antibiotic use in swine
- Antibiotic prophylaxis
- List of antibiotic-resistant bacteria
