= Brachyspira aalborgi =

Scientific classification
- Domain: Bacteria
- Kingdom: Pseudomonadati
- Phylum: Spirochaetota
- Class: Spirochaetia
- Order: Brachyspirales
- Family: Brachyspiraceae
- Genus: Brachyspira
- Species: B. aalborgi

Binomial name
- Brachyspira aalborgi Hovind-Hougen et al. 1982

Species of bacterium

Brachyspira aalborgi is a species of bacteria, one of the causative agents of intestinal spirochetosis. Its cells are anaerobic, sigmoidal with tapered ends, 2 to 6 μm long. Four flagella are inserted at each end of the cells. The maximal cell width is about 0.2 μm. The type strain is 513A (NCTC 11492).
