= Retapamulin =

Pharmaceutical drug

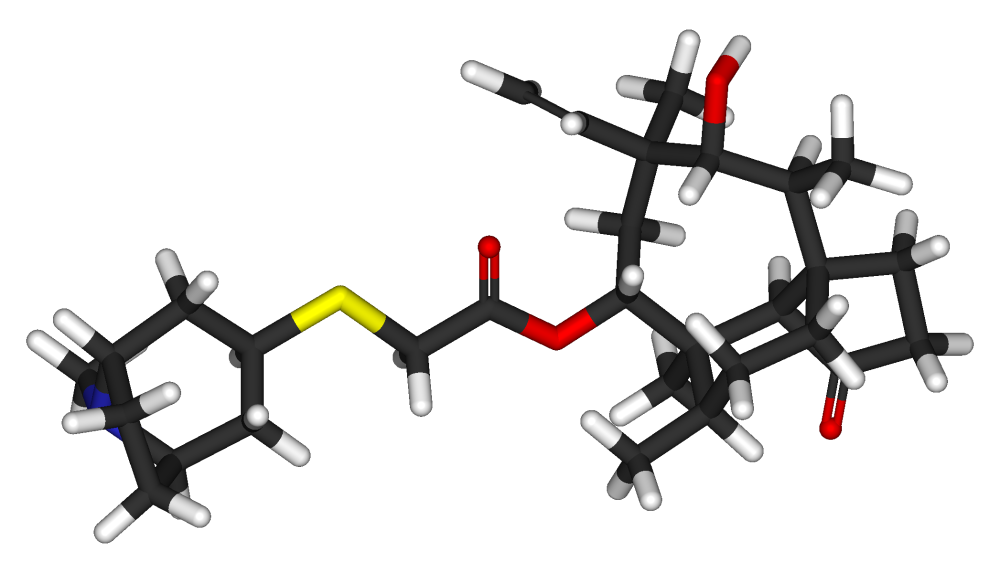

Clinical data
- Trade names: Altabax, Altargo
- AHFS/Drugs.com: Monograph
- MedlinePlus: a607049
- License data: EU EMA: by INN; US FDA: Retapamulin
- Routes of administration: Topical (ointment)
- ATC code: D06AX13 (WHO)

Legal status
- Legal status: UK: POM (Prescription only); US: ℞-only

Pharmacokinetic data
- Bioavailability: Low
- Protein binding: 94%
- Metabolism: Hepatic, CYP3A4-mediated
- Elimination half-life: Undetermined
- Excretion: Undetermined

Identifiers
- IUPAC name: (3aS,4R,5S,6S,8R,9R,9aR,10R)-6-ethenyl-5-hydroxy-4,6,9,10-tetramethyl-1-oxodecahydro-3a,9-propano-3aH-cyclopenta[8]annulen-8-yl{[(1R,3s,5S)-8-methyl-8-azabicyclo[3.2.1]oct-3-yl]sulfanyl}acetate
- CAS Number: 224452-66-8
- PubChem CID: 6918462
- DrugBank: DB01256
- ChemSpider: 25064484
- UNII: 4MG6O8991R
- KEGG: D05720
- ChEMBL: ChEMBL566434
- CompTox Dashboard (EPA): DTXSID00870265
- ECHA InfoCard: 100.167.142

Chemical and physical data
- Formula: C_{30}H_{47}NO_{4}S
- Molar mass: 517.77 g·mol^{−1}
- 3D model (JSmol): Interactive image
- SMILES: C[C@@H]1CC[C@@]23CCC(=O)[C@H]2[C@@]1([C@@H](C[C@@]([C@H]([C@@H]3C)O)(C)C=C)OC(=O)CS[C@@H]4C[C@H]5CC[C@@H](C4)N5C)C
- InChI: InChI=1S/C30H47NO4S/c1-7-28(4)16-24(35-25(33)17-36-22-14-20-8-9-21(15-22)31(20)6)29(5)18(2)10-12-30(19(3)27(28)34)13-11-23(32)26(29)30/h7,18-22,24,26-27,34H,1,8-17H2,2-6H3/t18-,19+,20-,21+,22-,24-,26+,27+,28-,29+,30+/m1/s1; Key:STZYTFJPGGDRJD-NHUWBDDWSA-N

Retapamulin is a topical antibiotic developed by GlaxoSmithKline. It is the first drug in the new class of pleuromutilin antibiotics to be approved for human use. It is marketed as an ointment under the brand names Altabax and Altargo.

Retapamulin was approved by the United States Food and Drug Administration in April 2007 for the treatment of bacterial skin infections such as impetigo. In May 2007, retapamulin received approval in the EU from the European Medicines Agency for the same indication.

Clinical trials have demonstrated its efficacy against certain Gram-positive bacteria including MRSA.

== Indications ==
Retapamulin is indicated for the topical treatment of impetigo due to Staphylococcus aureus (methicillin-susceptible only) or Streptococcus pyogenes.

== Pharmacology ==
=== Mechanism of action ===
Retapamulin is an antibacterial agent, specifically a protein synthesis inhibitor. The medication selectively inhibits bacterial protein synthesis by interacting at a site on the 50S subunit of the bacterial ribosome through an interaction that differs from other antibiotics.

=== Pharmacokinetics ===
Systemic exposure following topical application through intact skin is low.

== Contraindications ==
None yet reported.

== Adverse reactions ==
The most common reported adverse reaction was irritation at the application site.
