= Pleuromutilin =

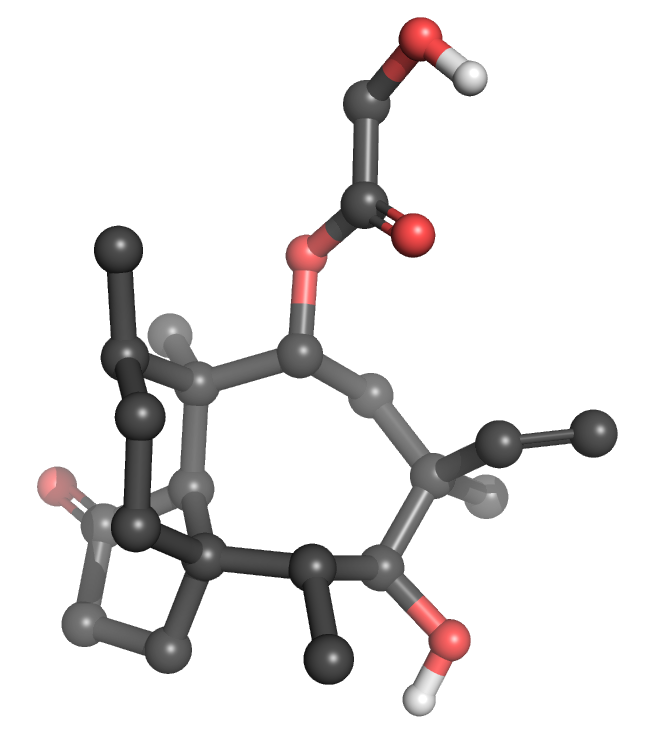

Names
- Preferred IUPAC name (3aS,4R,5S,6S,8R,9R,9aR,10R)-6-Ethenyl-5-hydroxy-4,6,9,10-tetramethyl-1-oxodecahydro-3a,9-propanocyclopenta[8]annulen-8-yl hydroxyacetate

Identifiers
CAS Number	125-65-5
3D model (JSmol)	Interactive image
ChEMBL	ChEMBL497295
ChemSpider	8061754
ECHA InfoCard	100.004.316
KEGG	C09169
PubChem CID	9886081
UNII	3DE4A80MZ1
CompTox Dashboard (EPA)	DTXSID9048720
- InChI: InChI=1S/C22H34O5/c1-6-20(4)11-16(27-17(25)12-23)21(5)13(2)7-9-22(14(3)19(20)26)10-8-15(24)18(21)22/h6,13-14,16,18-19,23,26H,1,7-12H2,2-5H3/t13-,14+,16-,18+,19+,20-,21+,22+/m1/s1 Key: ZRZNJUXESFHSIO-BKUNHTPHSA-N
- SMILES: C[C@@H]1CC[C@@]23CCC(=O)[C@H]2[C@@]1([C@@H](C[C@@]([C@H]([C@@H]3C)O)(C)C=C)OC(=O)CO)C

Properties
Chemical formula	C_{22}H_{34}O_{5}
Molar mass	378.509 g/mol
Melting point	170-171 °C
- Except where otherwise noted, data are given for materials in their standard state (at 25 °C [77 °F], 100 kPa). verify (what is ?) Infobox references

Pleuromutilin and its derivatives are antibacterial drugs that inhibit protein synthesis in bacteria by binding to the peptidyl transferase component of the 50S subunit of ribosomes.

This class of antibiotics includes the licensed drugs lefamulin (for systemic use in humans), retapamulin (approved for topical use in humans), valnemulin and tiamulin (approved for use in animals) and the investigational drug azamulin.

== History ==
Pleuromutilin was discovered as an antibiotic in 1951. It is derived from the fungi Omphalina mutila (formerly Pleurotus mutilus) and Clitopilus passeckerianus (formerly Pleurotus passeckerianus), and has also been found in Drosophila subatrata, Clitopilus scyphoides, and some other Clitopilus species.

== Total synthesis ==
The total synthesis of pleuromutilin has been reported.

== Biosynthesis ==
Pleuromutilin belongs to the class of secondary metabolites known as terpenes, which are produced in fungi through the mevalonate pathway (MEP pathway). Its synthetic bottleneck lays on the production of the precursor GGPP and the following formation of the tricyclic structure, which is catalyzed by Pl-cyc, a bifunctional diterpene synthase (DTS). This Cyclase shows a new class II DTS activity, catalyzes a ring contraction and the formation of a 5-6-bicyclic ring structure. Specifically, DTS shows two catalytic distinguishable domains: On the one hand it has at the N-terminal region a class II DTS domain, which catalyzes a cascade cyclization, resulting in a decalin core. Subsequently, variable 1,2-proton and methyl shifts occur to translocate the carbocation towards one of the two interconnecting C-atoms and this intermediate induces a base-catalyzed ring contraction. Therefore, class II DTS promotes in general a ring contraction during the cyclisation of GGPP. On the other hand, at the C-terminal end it has a class I DTS domain, which catalyzes a conjugated dephosphorylation, generating the 8-membered cyclic core, followed by a 1,5-proton shift and a stereospecific hydroxylation to obtain premutilin.

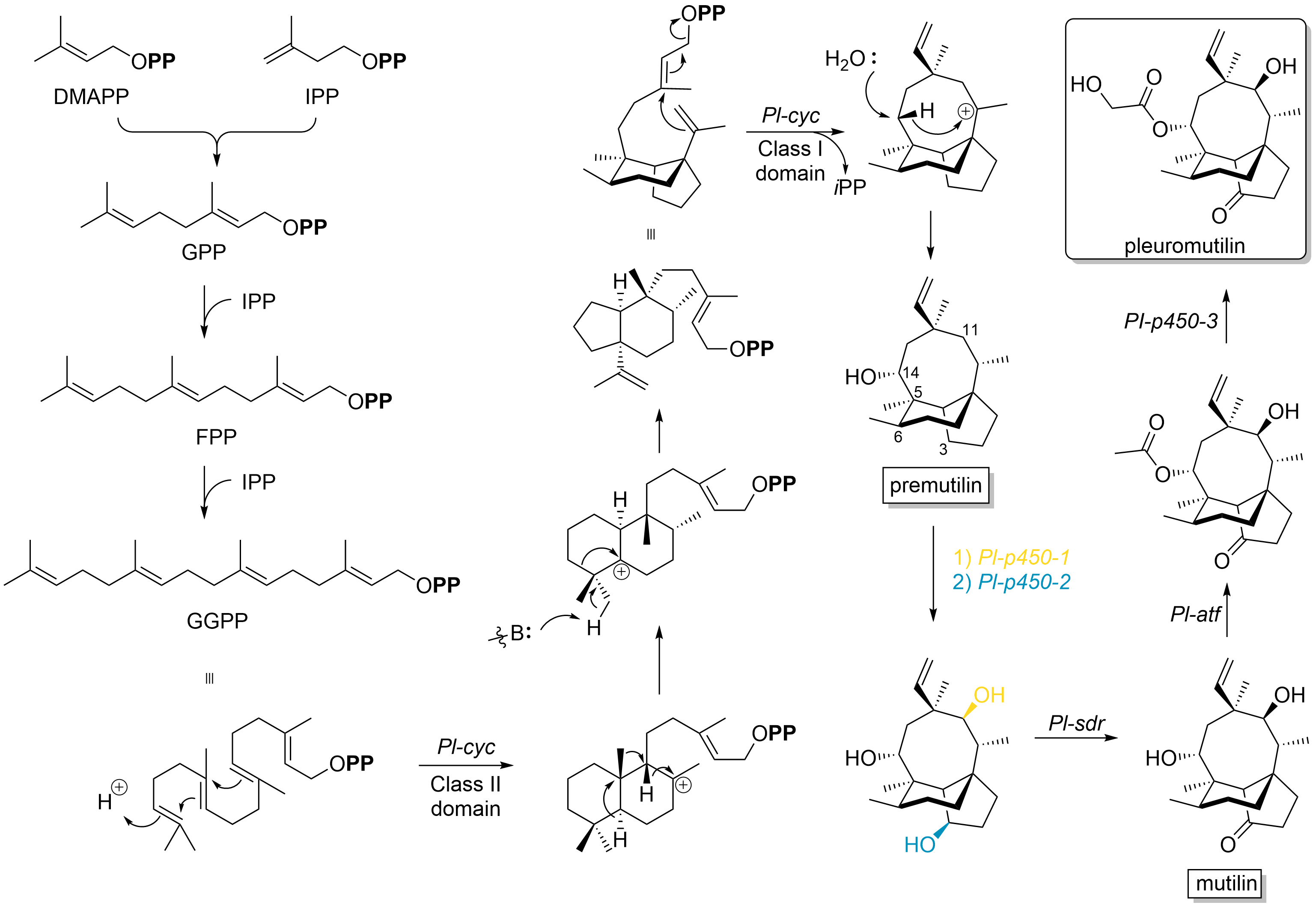
Proposed biosynthetic pathway of pleuromutilin. The left part of the scheme represents a general biosynthetic approach for Geranylgeranyl pyrophosphate (GGPP). The following cyclisation steps to the pleuromutilin tricyclic core will be provided by class II and class I terpene synthase domain of Pl-cyc. Final catalytic, stereospecific hydroxylation at C-11 and C-3 (Pl-p450-1, Pl-p450-2), regiospecific oxidation of the 3-hydroxy group to a ketone (Pl-sdr), acetyl-group-transfer at OH-14 (Pl-atf) and final hydroxylation at the α-acetyl position (Pl-p450-3) will lead to pleuromutilin.

Additionally, three cytochrome P450s (Pl-p450-1, Pl-p450-2 and Pl-p450-3) are involved in the final steps of the pleuromutilin biosynthetic pathway. The P450-1 and P450-2 are essential for hydroxylation of two ring structures regarding the premutilin skeleton, oxidating specifically at position C-11 and C-3, respectively. The short-chain dehydrogenase/reductase enzyme (Pl-sdr) has a regiospecific activity and converts the 3-hydroxy group to a ketone, forming the intermediate mutilin. Acetyltransferase (Pl-atf) catalyzes the transfer of acetyl group to 14-OH of mutilin. Finally, Pl-p450-3 hydroxylates the α-methyl group of the acetyl side chain generating pleuromutilin.
