= Brachyspira hyodysenteriae =

Scientific classification
- Domain: Bacteria
- Kingdom: Pseudomonadati
- Phylum: Spirochaetota
- Class: Spirochaetia
- Order: Brachyspirales
- Family: Brachyspiraceae
- Genus: Brachyspira
- Species: B. hyodysenteriae

Binomial name
- Brachyspira hyodysenteriae Harris et al. 1972

Synonyms
- Serpulina hyodysenteriae; Treponema hyodysenteriae

Species of bacterium

Brachyspira hyodysenteriae, formerly Serpulina hyodysenteriae and other binomial names, is a gram-negative anaerobic spirochete species of bacteria. It is the causative agent of swine dysentery.
