= Subtherapeutic antibiotic use in swine =

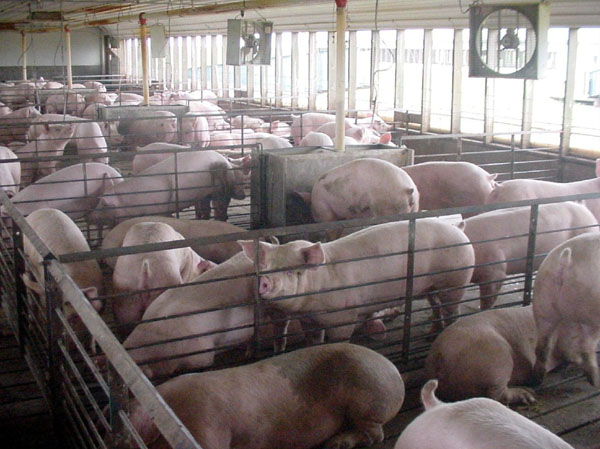
Commercial swine production

Antibiotics are commonly used in commercial swine production in the United States and around the world. They are used for disease treatment, disease prevention and control, and growth promotion. When used for growth promoting purposes, antibiotics are given at low concentrations for long periods of time. Low concentration of antibiotics, also referred to as subtherapeutic (STA), are given as feed and water additives which improve daily weight gain and feed efficiency through alterations in digestion and disease suppression. Additionally, the use of STA in swine results in healthier animals and reduces the "microbial load" on meat resulting in an assumed decrease in potential foodborne illness risk. While the benefits of subtherapeutic antibiotic administration are well-documented, there is much concern and debate regarding the development of bacterial antibiotic resistance associated with their use.

This is a specific case of the more general practice of antibiotic use in livestock.

== Amount and types of antibiotics used ==
Currently, there appears to be a lack of reliable data associated with the amount of antibiotics used in livestock production. In 2001, the Union of Concerned Scientists (UCS) published that 24.6 million pounds of antibiotics are used annually for growth promotant purposes. This, they claimed, represented 70% of the antibiotics produced annually in the United States. However, groups such as the Animal Health Institute have taken issue with this figure, accusing the UCS of using questionable methods and assumptions. Listed in Table 1 are the specific types of antibiotics used in swine disease treatment, prevention and growth promotion and their importance in human medicine.

Antibiotic	Use in Swine	Importance in Human Medicine
Sulfonamide	Growth	Not
Cephalosporin (3rd gen)	Disease treatment	Critical
Pencillins	Disease treatment, growth	High
Macrolides	Disease treatment, prevention, and growth	Critical
Tetracycline	Disease treatment, prevention, and growth	High
Lincosamide	Disease treatment	High
Pleuromutilin	Growth	Not
Polypeptide	Growth	Not
Carbadox	Growth	Not

Table 1- Commonly used antibiotics in swine production and their relative importance in human medicine. With regard to human medicine importance, FDA ranks antibiotics as "critically important" ("critical" in the above table), "highly important" ("high" in the table), or "important." The ranking is based on five criteria from the most important (it is used in treating pathogens that cause foodborne disease) to the least important (there is difficulty in transmitting resistance across genera and species).

== Antibiotic resistance development ==
Bacterial antibiotic resistance is a process that can occur when bacteria are exposed to STA administration. When a population of bacteria that resides in a hog are exposed to a particular antibiotic for growth promotant purposes, the bacteria that are susceptible to the drug die while the organisms that are resistant will not be affected and will continue to replicate, resulting in a higher proportion of resistant organisms. It has been shown that resistance to antibiotics develops in animals that are fed subtherapeutic doses of antibiotics for growth promoting purposes. Certain bacteria that have the potential to cause human illness, such as Salmonella, that naturally reside in the swine gastrointestinal tracts are constantly exposed to antibiotics. With time, these bacteria become resistant to that class of antibiotics. There is great concern regarding the probability of subtherapeutic antibiotic use in swine causing treatment failures in human medicine.

== Resistance and the risk of treatment failure ==
There is concern that use of antibiotics in swine is leading to an increase in resistant bacteria. The reason for concern is that these resistant bacteria could lead to food-borne illness that is less responsive to treatment. Many proponents of the ban cite the "precautionary principle" of public health, which states if there is evidence of harm, the method in question should be avoided. Risk assessment studies have explored the possibility of harm more objectively through causal pathways and model building. These studies show a very small risk of failure of medical treatment due to resistant bacteria caused by the feeding of STA to livestock. For example, a stochastic risk assessment done in 2008 showed that the risk of consequences from an infection with drug resistant Campylobacteriosis was approximately 1 in 82 million.

The general causal pathway depends on a number of variables and probabilities. First, the animal must be harboring resistant bacteria and the bacteria have a probability that they can survive from the animal to the dinner table at infectious doses. Humans must then be exposed to these resistant bacteria by eating undercooked meat or coming into contact with them in the environment. Resistant bacteria and their genetic material that codes for resistance are not only found in food, but also the environment. For example, studies have found that resistant bacteria can leak from hog waste lagoons into ground water, creating an exposure through the public water supply. Upon exposure, an individual must develop illness that is severe enough for them to seek medical attention. Factors such as age and immune system condition may influence disease susceptibility, which could impact the severity of disease. If the individual becomes ill and needs medical attention, a physician may prescribe an antibiotic. This pathway depends on the medical doctor's ability to identify potential antibiotic resistance before prescribing treatment to a patient affected by food-borne illness. If the bacteria causing the illness is resistant to the drug the physician recommended, then the illness will not be improved by the medication. This could potentially lead to increased morbidity and mortality.

== European ban and legislation in the United States ==
In 1999, the European Union banned the use of subtherapeutic antibiotics in livestock. Data from Europe, particularly from Denmark, shows that the prevalence of bacteria resistant to particular antibiotics has decreased since the ban. Some opponents of the use of subtherapeutic antibiotics in swine cite data and results from Europe to support a ban in the United States. They argue that since the ban in Europe, antibiotics resistance has decreased while the overall health of swine has remained the same.

In 2003, the Food and Drug Administration of the USA released Guidance #152, which makes recommendations on how to best develop new animal drugs with regard to the potential impacts on human health. In the summer of 2010, the FDA released Guidance #209, which suggests limited livestock use of antibiotics that are medically important to humans. In 2009, Rep. Louise Slaughter introduced HR 1549, otherwise known as The Preservation of Antibiotics for Medical Treatment Act (PAMTA). Under this bill, medically important antibiotics would be phased out in livestock and other restrictions would be placed on antibiotic use in food-producing animals. Some scientists argue that withdrawing antibiotic use will result in more diseased animals, which can result in an increased bacterial load on meat and an increased risk of food-borne illness. Opponents of such a ban argue that the economic implications would be devastating in terms of higher food prices. One study found that the price of pork would increase five cents a pound.
