= Tiamulin =

Chemical compound

Clinical data
- Trade names: Dynamutilin, others
- Routes of administration: Oral
- ATCvet code: QJ01XQ01 (WHO)

Legal status
- Legal status: Veterinary use only

Identifiers
- IUPAC name: [(1S,2R,3S,4S,6R,7R,8R,14R)-4-ethenyl-3-hydroxy-2,4,7,14-tetramethyl-9-oxo-6-tricyclo[5.4.3.0^{1,8}]tetradecanyl] 2-[2-(diethylamino)ethylsulfanyl]acetate
- CAS Number: 55297-95-5
- PubChem CID: 656958
- ChemSpider: 571196
- UNII: E38WZ4U54R
- ChEBI: CHEBI:44137
- ChEMBL: ChEMBL498466
- CompTox Dashboard (EPA): DTXSID2046701
- ECHA InfoCard: 100.054.145

Chemical and physical data
- Formula: C_{28}H_{47}NO_{4}S
- Molar mass: 493.75 g·mol^{−1}
- 3D model (JSmol): Interactive image
- SMILES: CCN(CC)CCSCC(=O)O[C@@H]1C[C@@]([C@H]([C@@H]([C@@]23CC[C@H]([C@@]1([C@@H]2C(=O)CC3)C)C)C)O)(C)C=C
- InChI: InChI=1S/C28H47NO4S/c1-8-26(6)17-22(33-23(31)18-34-16-15-29(9-2)10-3)27(7)19(4)11-13-28(20(5)25(26)32)14-12-21(30)24(27)28/h8,19-20,22,24-25,32H,1,9-18H2,2-7H3/t19-,20+,22-,24+,25+,26-,27+,28+/m1/s1; Key:UURAUHCOJAIIRQ-QGLSALSOSA-N

Tiamulin (previously thiamutilin) is a pleuromutilin antibiotic drug that is used in veterinary medicine particularly for pigs and poultry.

Tiamulin is a diterpene antimicrobial with a pleuromutilin chemical structure similar to that of valnemulin.
