= Azamulin =

Antibiotic

Clinical data
- ATC code: None

Identifiers
- IUPAC name: (1S,2R,3S,4R,6R,7R,8R,14R)-4-Ethyl-3-hydroxy-2,4,7,14-tetramethyl-9-oxotricyclo[5.4.3.0^{1,8}]tetradec-6-yl [(5-amino-1H-1,2,4-triazol-3-yl)sulfanyl]acetate
- CAS Number: 76530-44-4
- PubChem CID: 16072188
- ChemSpider: 17231671
- UNII: 875AQ866X1
- ChEMBL: ChEMBL2103760

Chemical and physical data
- Formula: C_{24}H_{38}N_{4}O_{4}S
- Molar mass: 478.65 g·mol^{−1}
- 3D model (JSmol): Interactive image
- SMILES: CC[C@@]1(C[C@H]([C@@]2([C@@H](CC[C@@]3([C@H]2C(=O)CC3)[C@H]([C@@H]1O)C)C)C)OC(=O)CSc4nc([nH]n4)N)C
- InChI: InChI=1S/C24H38N4O4S/c1-6-22(4)11-16(32-17(30)12-33-21-26-20(25)27-28-21)23(5)13(2)7-9-24(14(3)19(22)31)10-8-15(29)18(23)24/h13-14,16,18-19,31H,6-12H2,1-5H3,(H3,25,26,27,28)/t13-,14+,16-,18+,19+,22-,23+,24+/m1/s1; Key:FMHQJXGMLMSMLC-WBUYAQKGSA-N

Azamulin is a pleuromutilin antibiotic. As of 2021, it is not marketed in the US or Europe.

In pharmacological studies, the substance is used as an inhibitor of the liver enzymes CYP3A4 and CYP3A5.
