= Antibiotic use in the United States poultry farming industry =

Antibiotic use in the United States poultry farming industry is the controversial prophylactic use of antibiotics in the country's poultry farming industry. It differs from the common practice in Europe, where antibiotics for growth promotion were disallowed in the 1950s.

Since their approval by the Food and Drug Administration (FDA) in 1951, antibiotics have been extensively used in large quantities. Three years prior to their approval, scientists were investigating a phenomenon in which chickens that were exposed to bacteria-rich manure displayed signs of better health compared to those that were not. Testing revealed that chickens fed with a variety of vitamin B12 produced with the residue of a specific antibiotic grew 50% faster than chickens fed with B12 from a different source. Further research confirmed that antibiotic use improved chicken health, resulting in increased egg production, lower mortality rates, and reduced illness. Consequently, farmers shifted from expensive animal proteins to comparatively inexpensive antibiotics and B12, as it enabled chickens to reach market weight faster and at a lower cost. With a growing population and increased demand, antibiotics seemed to be an ideal and cost-effective way to boost poultry output. However, in recent times, antibiotic use in poultry production has become a subject of debate because of concerns about bacterial antibiotic resistance.

== Emerging threats: antibiotic resistance ==
The Centers for Disease Control and Prevention (CDC) has identified the emergence of antibiotic resistance as a national threat. The concern over antibiotic use in livestock arises from the necessity antibiotics have in keeping populations disease-free. As of 2016, over 70% of FDA approved antibiotics were utilized in modern, high production poultry farms to prevent, control, and treat disease. The FDA released a report in 2009 estimating that 29 million pounds (13 kt) of antibiotics had been used in livestock in that year alone. However, surveillance of consumer exposure to antibiotics through poultry consumption is limited. More specifically in 2012, the FDA speculated the most significant public health threat in regard to antimicrobial use in animals is the exposure of antimicrobial-resistant bacteria to humans. These statements have been challenged by the American meat industry lobbyists, who posit that antibiotics are used responsibly and judiciously in order to ensure effectiveness.

== Consumer health effects ==
Consumers are exposed to antibiotic resistance through consumption of poultry products that have prior exposure to resistant strains. In poultry husbandry, the practice of using medically important antibiotics can select for resistant strains of bacteria, which are then transferred to consumers through poultry meat and eggs. The CDC acknowledges this transferral pathway in their 2013 report of Antibiotic Resistant Threats in the United States. The annual rate of foodborne illness in America is one in six. For the 48 million individuals affected, antibiotics play a critical role in thwarting mortality rates. In a literature review conducted by the Review of Antimicrobial Resistance 100 out of 139 studies found evidence of a link between antibiotic use in animals and antibiotic resistance in consumers.

When a gram-negative bacterial infection is suspected in a patient, one of the first-line options for treatment is in the fluoroquinolone family. This, along with penicillin, is one of the first families of antibiotics utilized in the broiler industry. If this first-line treatment is not successful, a stronger class of antibiotics is typically used, however, there is a limitation on how many classes are available, as well as which medications are available on hospital formularies. There is also more drug toxicity affiliated with second and third line antibiotic options. This is one example why it is critical to keep as many first-line antibiotic options available for human use.

Other issues are associated with duration and complexity of infection. On average, treatment for non-resistant bacteria is administered 11.5 hours after diagnosis, and treatment for resistant bacteria is administered 72 hours after diagnosis. This is a reflection of the additional threat of prolonged incubation, leading to greater potential for systemic disease, with higher morbidity and mortality associated with opportunities for complications, and prolonged treatment time. For example, of the two million people affected by resistant infections a year, 23,000 will die. Severity in mortality is coupled when exposed to high risk populations such as immunocompromised and elderly individuals in hospital and nursing home settings.

== History of federal policy on antibiotic use in livestock ==
- 1940s – Beginning of utilization of antibiotics in livestock feed}
- 1951 – Antibiotics first FDA approved for use in poultry. Approved uses included production (growth enhancement), treatment, control, or prevention of animal disease. Antibiotics were also available for purchase over the counter at that time.
- 1970 – FDA task force publication proposes limitations of utilizing antibiotics in livestock feed that are also used in humans.
- 1975 – Secondary to this publication, drug sponsors are required to submit studies demonstrating the antibiotics did not harm human health
- 1976 – Stuart Levy study demonstrating tetracycline resistant E. coli moving to consumers
- 1977 – FDA proposal to remove penicillin and tetracycline in subtherapeutic doses, however, request by Congress for further studies to be conducted.
- 1980 – National Academy of Science recruited by the FDA to conduct further studies, specifically for penicillins and tetracyclines. Conclusion from these studies indicated no sufficient evidence to ban these antibiotics.
- 1980s-early 2000s – Further studies continued, supported by the FDA
- 2003 – FDA issued guidance to pharmaceuticals for an approval process utilizing new antibiotics in animal feed. For antibiotics already in use, the FDA would have to withdraw approval for each individual medication.
- 2005 – Enrofloxacin, an already utilized antibiotic, was removed from poultry production. This took 5 years to accomplish.
- 2010 – FDA first draft of “voluntary” limitations of medically important antibiotics in livestock, and requirement of veterinarian oversight, which would later become "Guidance for Industry #209".
- 2011 – FDA removed original request from 1977 to remove penicillins and tetracyclines in feed.
- 2012 – FDA finalized "Guidance for Industry #209", which was implemented under the Veterinary Feed Directives. These guidelines were issued to pharmaceuticals.
- 2013 – FDA issues “Guidance for Industry #213,” which provided additional information to pharmaceuticals for recommendations from #209.
- 2014 – All 26 pharmaceutical companies producing antibiotics used in livestock feed agreed to the FDA guidelines in #213. Given total of 3 years to make all recommended changes.

== Current U.S. federal regulators ==
National Antimicrobial Resistance Monitoring System's (NARMS) Enteric Bacteria program – Established in 1996, and represents a collaboration between the USDA, FDA, and CDC. Its purpose is to organize these organizations into a drug monitoring program for antibiotics utilized in animal feed with the goal of maintaining their medical efficacy. There are three branches which oversee humans, retail meat, and food animals.

- USDA – Operating under the Food Safety and Inspection Service (FSIS). Main role is in charge of testing imported and domestic meat for antimicrobial resistant bacteria. If a "residue violation" found, they may condemn the product. Regardless, funding and resources are not available for outbreak investigations at farms or ranches.
- USDA – Operating under The National Organic Program (NOP) uniform national standards are used to create rules & regulations for the production, handling, labeling, and enforcement of all USDA organic products. Since at least 1990 use of any usage growth promoters, hormones, antibiotics and synthetic trace elements used to stimulate growth have been strictly forbidden in all USDA certified organic poultry and other livestock animals. The prohibition applies even in the case the dose is low enough to be considered "sub therapeutic" and applies regardless of how the substances route of administration. This also effects egg products as they must come from animals raised in full compliance to NOP guidelines in order to receive USDA Organic certification.
- FDA – Operating under the Center for Veterinary Medicine (CVM). Works with CDC to monitor retail meat.
- CDC – Monitors human samples.

== Vertical integration ==
This is the current business structure utilized almost universally in the broiler, or chicken bred for meat, industry. This also began in the 1940s when antibiotics began to be utilized in livestock feed. Perdue is credited as the pioneer of this structure. The basis is centralization of production. "Integrators" control cost, policy, and are the decision makers of production. They decide feed formulations, choice of antibiotic administration, and cover those costs in addition to veterinary services. They also own the poultry that is grown. Farmers are labeled as "growers" or "operators." They own the land and buildings where the poultry is grown, and are essentially caretakers for the poultry growth to the integrators. The benefit for growers in this business structure is they are guaranteed payment from the Integrators, which is compensated in weight gained by each flock. Due to this structure, about 90% of broilers are raised within 60 miles of the processing plant. Integrators are large poultry companies such as Perdue, Tyson, Pilgrim's Pride, and Koch Foods. As of 2011, there were about 20 of these companies in the U.S. that controlled 96% of all broilers produced that year.

== Regulatory surveys ==
There are two main surveys distributed to farmers by the federal government to aid in various regulations of the agricultural industry. They are the Agricultural and Resource Management Survey (ARMS) and the National Animal Health Monitoring Survey (NAHMS).

Agricultural and Resource Management Survey (ARMS) – Ran by the USDA's Economic Research Service (ERS) and National Agricultural Statistics Service (NASS). The main focus is finances of farming, production practices, and resource use. Seventeen total states are sampled every 5–6 years per livestock type, with the most recent surveys distributed to broiler farmers in 2006 and 2011. There was one question about utilization of antibiotics in poultry food or water, excluding use for illness treatment.

== Antibiotic-resistant outbreaks from poultry meat ==
In order to minimize and prevent any residues of antibiotics in chicken meat, any chickens given antibiotics are required to have a "withdrawal" period before they can be slaughtered. Samples of poultry at slaughter are randomly tested by the FSIS, and show a very low percentage of residue violations. Although violations are minimal, these small amounts of antibiotics have still contributed to antibiotic resistant outbreaks in the U.S. There are five infectious agents that account for 90% of foodborne related deaths. Three consistently found in poultry are: Salmonella, Campylobacter, and Escherichia coli.

- 2014: Outbreak of Salmonella in 634 people across 29 states (38% hospitalized) from eating chicken from Foster Farms that was sold at Costco. 44/68 tested isolates were resistant to at least 1 drug (65%), and 4 of 5 chicken samples tested were drug resistant (80%).
- 2015: Outbreak of Salmonella in 15 people in 7 states (4 hospitalized) from eating frozen stuffed chicken produced by Barber Foods.

== Limitations and challenges ==
One obstacle to gathering more comprehensive data on the use of antibiotics in feed is the majority of the poultry industry utilizes vertical integration. As a consequence, farmers are often unaware of what components go into the feed, including whether or not antibiotics are used. Also in antibiotic usage in general, there are criteria to define bacterial resistance to specific antibiotics, however, there are no standards to divide the bacteria into resistant and susceptible categories based on antibiotics utilized.

The poultry industry also plays a large part in the United States economy, both in domestic purchasing and through international demand. The USDA reports that the United States is the "world's largest producer and second largest exporter of poultry meat." In 2010, it produced 36.9 billion pounds of broiler meat and exported 6.8 billion pounds of broiler meat. This equates to an estimated retail value of 45 billion dollars in 2010.

Both the agricultural and pharmaceutical industries have been lobbying against legislation that seeks to quell non-therapeutic antibiotic use in livestock since the first introduction of such legislation in Congress in the 1970s. Despite scientific evidence suggesting a strong association between antibiotic use in poultry and other livestock, agribusiness lobbies such as The National Chicken Council argue that there is not sufficient evidence to purport that there is a measurable impact to humans and shifts the blame of the problem of antibiotic resistance to overprescribing in the field of medicine.

With antibiotic restrictions, integrators will bear the immediate costs of these changes, and would likely result in modified finances and contracts with growers. Also, public health agencies may not have adequate scientific evidence for making appropriate decisions for better public health outcomes, secondary to lack of research funds. As a reference, America spends about $101 billion per year for both governmental and biomedical industrial research, which is only 5% of total health expenditures.

== Solutions ==
Several policies have been proposed to improve data collection and transparency in livestock production. For example, the 2013 Delivering Antimicrobial Transparency in Animals (DATA) Act proposed the enactment of policies to acquire more accurate documentation of antibiotic use in growth promotion by farmers, drug manufacturers, and the FDA. The Preservation of Antibiotics for Medical Treatment Act (PAMTA) was enacted to eliminate the use of medically important antibiotics in livestock. In 2015, the Preventing Antibiotic Resistance Act (PARA) was passed with two components: requirement of drug companies to provide evidence that antibiotics that are approved for use in poultry, and that meat production does not add to the growing threat of antibiotic resistance in humans. Antimicrobial Stewardship Programs (ASPs) serve as an example of systematic monitoring and analysis of data via interdisciplinary and multi-sectoral collaboration.

Performing quality improvement in the process of livestock production is another focus. Some alternative methods include "improving hygiene, using enzymes, probiotics, prebiotics, and acids to improve health and utilizing bacteriocins, antimicrobial peptides, and bacteriophages as substitutes for antibiotics." Adaptations of methods by other countries is an additional focus. For example, the use of antibiotics in feed was banned in Sweden in 1985 with no compensatory increase in antibiotic usage in other sectors of production, proving that a ban can be successfully administered without unintended impacts on other categories.

Major producers in the poultry industry have also begun to make strides towards change, largely due to public concern over the widespread use of antibiotics in poultry. Some producers have started eliminating the use of antibiotics in order to produce and market chickens that may legally be labeled "antibiotic free." In 2007, Perdue began phasing out all medically important antibiotics from its feed and hatcheries and began selling poultry products labeled "no antibiotics ever" under the Harvestland brand. Consumer response was positive and in 2014 Perdue also began phasing out ionophores from its hatchery and began using the "antibiotic free" labels on its Harvestland, Simply Smart and Perfect Portions products.

== Impacts of change ==
As Guidance for Industry #213 has been voluntarily accepted, it will be a violation of the Federal Food, Drug, and Cosmetic Act to use antibiotics in livestock production for non-therapeutic purposes. However, as there is now a requirement for veterinary oversight and approval for antibiotics use, there is leeway in the interpretation of non-therapeutic purposes dependent on the situation. For example, per the FDA, "a veterinarian may determine, based on the client's production practices and history, that weaned beef calves arriving at a feedlot in bad weather after a lengthy transport are at risk to develop a bacterial respiratory infection. In this case, the veterinarian might choose to preventively treat these calves with an antimicrobial approved for prevention of that bacterial infection."

The FDA is not trying to regulate all antimicrobials at this time – only those antibiotics which are considered "medically important." For example, bacitracin, a common antibiotic found in over the counter antibiotic ointments, is not classified as "medically important." Ionophores, which are not a part of human medicine but given for improving the health of livestock, are also not included in this regulation.
