= Porcine intestinal spirochaetosis =

Bacterial disease of pigs

Porcine intestinal spirochaetosis is a notifiable pig disease caused by certain spirochetal bacteria (Brachyspira hyodysenteriae and Brachyspira pilosicoli. Infection causes mild gastrointestinal signs in young pigs and can also be transmitted as intestinal spirochetosis in humans, as it is a zoonosis.

The disease is widespread in pig-rearing countries and may be referred to as PIS, spirochaetal diarrhoea and porcine colonic spirochaetosis.

== Clinical signs and diagnosis ==
Clinical signs are most commonly seen in young pigs aged eight to 14 weeks. Normally, a greyish diarrhoea is seen in individual piglets, and poor growth rates and feed conversion ratios are observed on a herd level.

Stress, caused by moving and mixing groups of piglets, can increase incidence.

A definitive diagnosis can be made by culturing the bacterium on a specific blood agar medium, followed by PCR. Alternatively, necropsy and histological examination of the large intestine can confirm the diagnosis.

== Treatment and control ==
Antibiotics are the treatment of choice. They should be administered by injection or in drinking water. Pig husbandry measures should be employed to ensure that stressors such as the mixing and moving of pigs are kept to a minimum to reduce disease incidence.
