= Intestinal spirochetosis =

- Other names: Intestinal spirochetes, colonic spirochetosis, colonic spirochetes, brachyspirosis
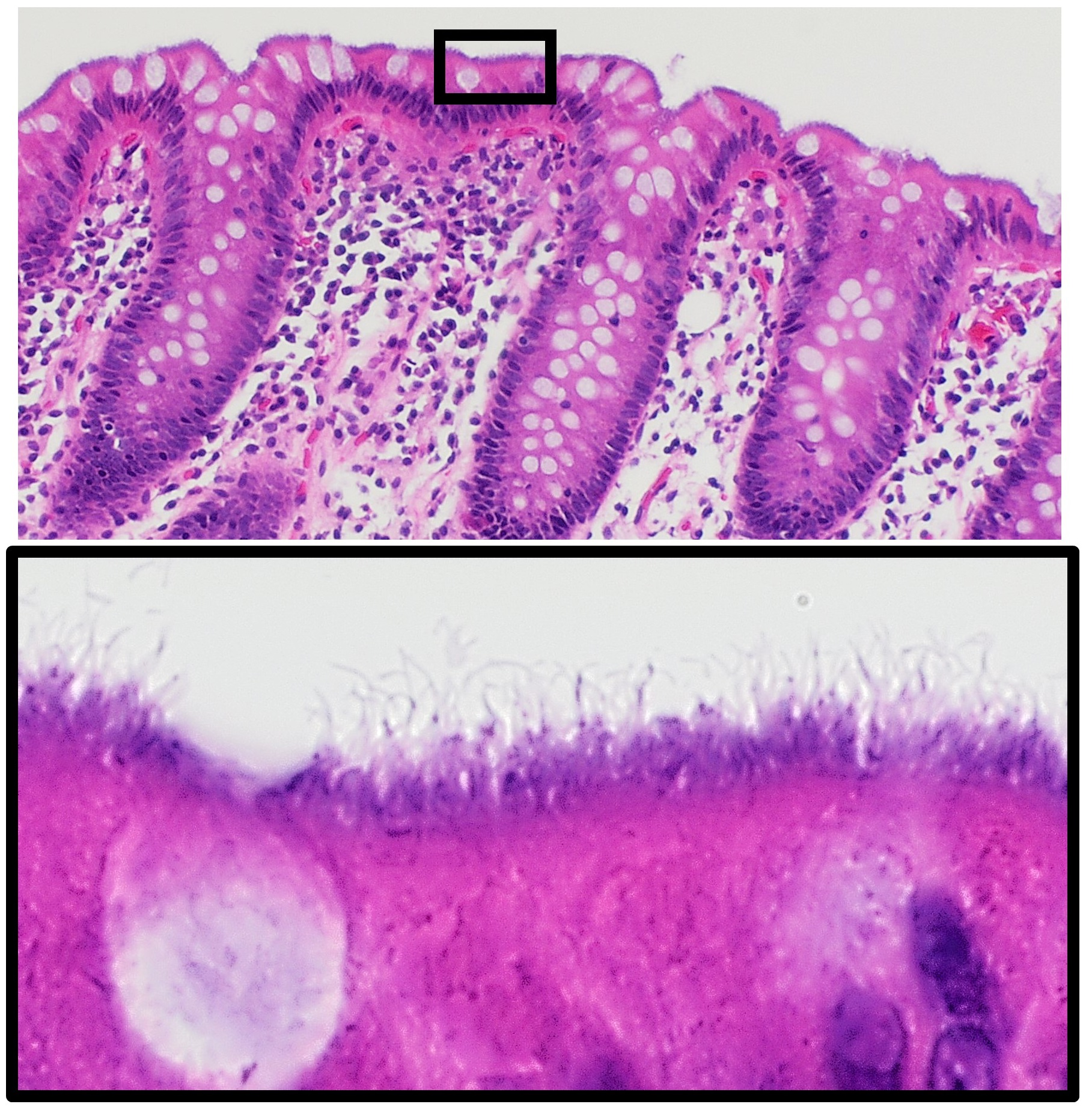
- Histopathology of intestinal spirochetosis, showing basophilic, fringe-like, end-on-end attachment of filamentous densely packed spirochetes on the surface epithelium of the intestinal mucosa. H&E stain.
- Specialty: Infectious disease

Human intestinal spirochetosis, often called just intestinal spirochetosis when the human context is implicit, is an infection of the colonic-type mucosa with certain species of spirochetal bacteria. Similar infections sometimes occur in pigs, dogs, and birds; porcine intestinal spirochaetosis is an economically important disease of livestock.

== Signs and symptoms ==
No clear association exists with complaints. However, potential associations include abdominal pain and watery diarrhea, which may be seen with blood; however, these findings are not specific and may be due to a number of other causes.

== Cause ==
Human intestinal spirochetosis is caused by Brachyspira pilosicoli and Brachyspira aalborgi. Porcine and avian intestinal spirochetosis are caused by Brachyspira hyodysenteriae and Brachyspira pilosicoli.

== Diagnosis ==
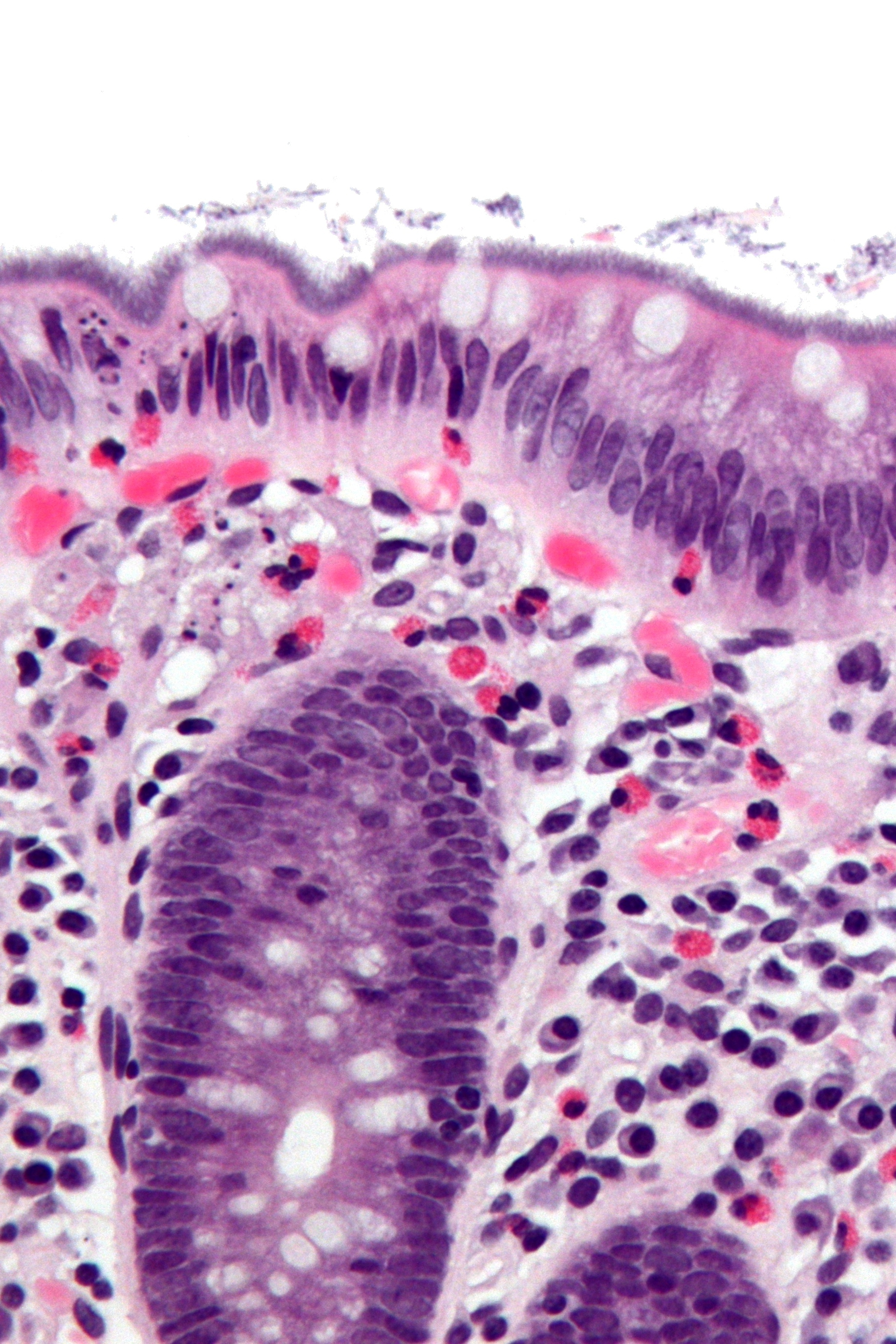
Micrograph showing intestinal spirochetosis. H&E stain.

It is diagnosed by examination of tissue, i.e., biopsy. A hallmark finding is the presence of a “false brush border” on the luminal surface of the epithelium, formed by dense linear colonization of spirochetes.

== Treatment ==
High-dose metronidazole is considered effective in eliminating the causative bacteria.

== See also ==
- Cryptosporidiosis
