= Valnemulin =

Chemical compound

Clinical data
- Trade names: Econor, others
- AHFS/Drugs.com: International Drug Names
- Routes of administration: By mouth (in-feed)
- ATCvet code: QJ01XQ02 (WHO)

Legal status
- Legal status: EU: Rx-only

Identifiers
- IUPAC name: (3aS,4R,5S,6S,8R,9R,9aR,10R)-6-ethenyl- 5-hydroxy-4,6,9,10-tetramethyl-1-oxodecahydro- 3a,9-propano-3aH-cyclopenta[8]annulen-8-yl- [(R)-2-(2-amino-3-methylbutanoylamino)-1,1-dimethtylethyl sulfanyl]acetate
- CAS Number: 101312-92-9
- PubChem CID: 127791
- ChemSpider: 8026591
- UNII: 2AHC415BQG
- ChEMBL: ChEMBL1688852
- CompTox Dashboard (EPA): DTXSID2046751

Chemical and physical data
- Formula: C_{31}H_{52}N_{2}O_{5}S
- Molar mass: 564.83 g·mol^{−1}
- 3D model (JSmol): Interactive image
- SMILES: O=C(NCC(SCC(=O)O[C@@H]2C[C@@](\C=C)([C@@H](O)[C@@H]([C@]31[C@@H](C(=O)CC1)[C@@]2(C)[C@H](C)CC3)C)C)(C)C)[C@H](N)C(C)C
- InChI: InChI=1S/C31H52N2O5S/c1-10-29(8)15-22(38-23(35)16-39-28(6,7)17-33-27(37)24(32)18(2)3)30(9)19(4)11-13-31(20(5)26(29)36)14-12-21(34)25(30)31/h10,18-20,22,24-26,36H,1,11-17,32H2,2-9H3,(H,33,37)/t19-,20+,22-,24-,25+,26+,29-,30+,31+/m1/s1; Key:LLYYNOVSVPBRGV-MVNKZKPCSA-N

Valnemulin, sold under the brand name Econor among others, is a pleuromutilin antibiotic used to treat swine dysentery, ileitis, colitis, and pneumonia. It is also used for the prevention of intestinal infections of swine. Valnemulin has been observed to induce a rapid reduction of clinical symptoms of Mycoplasma bovis infection, and eliminate M. bovis from the lungs of calves.
