= Carbadox =

Names
- IUPAC name Methyl (2E)-2-[(1,4-dioxidoquinoxalin-2-yl)methylene]hydrazinecarboxylate
- Other names Mecadox

Identifiers
CAS Number	6804-07-5
3D model (JSmol)	Interactive image
ChEBI	CHEBI:94744
ChEMBL	ChEMBL13779
ChemSpider	10606106
ECHA InfoCard	100.027.163
EC Number	229-879-0
PubChem CID	135403805
RTECS number	FE2779000
UNII	M2X04R2E2Y
CompTox Dashboard (EPA)	DTXSID6043913
- InChI: InChI=1S/C11H10N4O4/c1-19-11(16)13-12-6-8-7-14(17)9-4-2-3-5-10(9)15(8)18/h2-7H,1H3,(H,13,16)/b12-6+ Key: OVGGLBAWFMIPPY-WUXMJOGZSA-N; InChI=1/C11H10N4O4/c1-19-11(16)13-12-6-8-7-14(17)9-4-2-3-5-10(9)15(8)18/h2-7H,1H3,(H,13,16)/b12-6+ Key: OVGGLBAWFMIPPY-WUXMJOGZBN
- SMILES: COC(=O)N\N=C\c2c[n+]([O-])c1ccccc1[n+]2[O-]

Properties
Chemical formula	C_{11}H_{10}N_{4}O_{4}
Molar mass	262.225 g·mol^{−1}
Appearance	Yellow crystals
Density	1.44 g/cm^{3}
Melting point	239.5 °C (463.1 °F; 512.6 K)
Solubility in water	Insoluble

Hazards
- GHS labelling
Pictograms	(GHS02: Flammable) (GHS07: Exclamation mark)
Signal word	Warning
Hazard statements	H228, H302
Precautionary statements	P210, P240, P241, P264, P270, P280, P301+P312, P330, P370+P378, P501
- Except where otherwise noted, data are given for materials in their standard state (at 25 °C [77 °F], 100 kPa). verify (what is ?) Infobox references

Carbadox is a veterinary drug that combats infection in swine, particularly swine dysentery.

== Indications ==
Carbadox is indicated for control of swine dysentery (vibrionic dysentery, bloody scours, or hemorrhagic dysentery); control of bacterial swine enteritis (salmonellosis or necrotic enteritis caused by Salmonella enterica); aid in the prevention of migration and establishment of large roundworm (Ascaris suum) infections; aid in the prevention of establishment of nodular worm (Oesophagostomum) infections.

== Safety ==
In animal models, carbadox has been shown to be carcinogenic and to induce birth defects. The Food and Drug Administration's Center for Veterinary Medicine has questioned the safety in light of its possible carcinogenicity.

== Regulation ==
Carbadox is approved in the United States only for use in swine and may not be used within 42 days of slaughter or used in pregnant animals. In 2016, the United States Food and Drug Administration moved to ban its use in pork, citing a potential cancer risk to humans. However, as of August 2018, FDA had indefinitely stayed its withdrawal of approval and carbadox remains available.

In 2004, carbadox was banned by the Canadian government as a livestock feed additive and for human consumption. The European Union also forbids the use of carbadox at any level. Australia forbids the use of carbadox in food producing animals.
