= Brachyspiraceae =

Scientific classification
- Domain: Bacteria
- Kingdom: Pseudomonadati
- Phylum: Spirochaetota
- Class: Spirochaetia
- Order: Brachyspirales; Gupta et al. 2014
- Family: Brachyspiraceae; Paster 2012

Genera
- Brachyspira; "Ca. Maribrachyspira"

Family of bacteria

Brachyspiraceae is a family of Spirochaetota.

Spirochetosis of the Appendix, caused by Brachyspira aalborgi or Brachyspira pilosicoli, is not associated with appendicitis.
