= Biodiversity offsetting =

System to mitigate negative development impacts

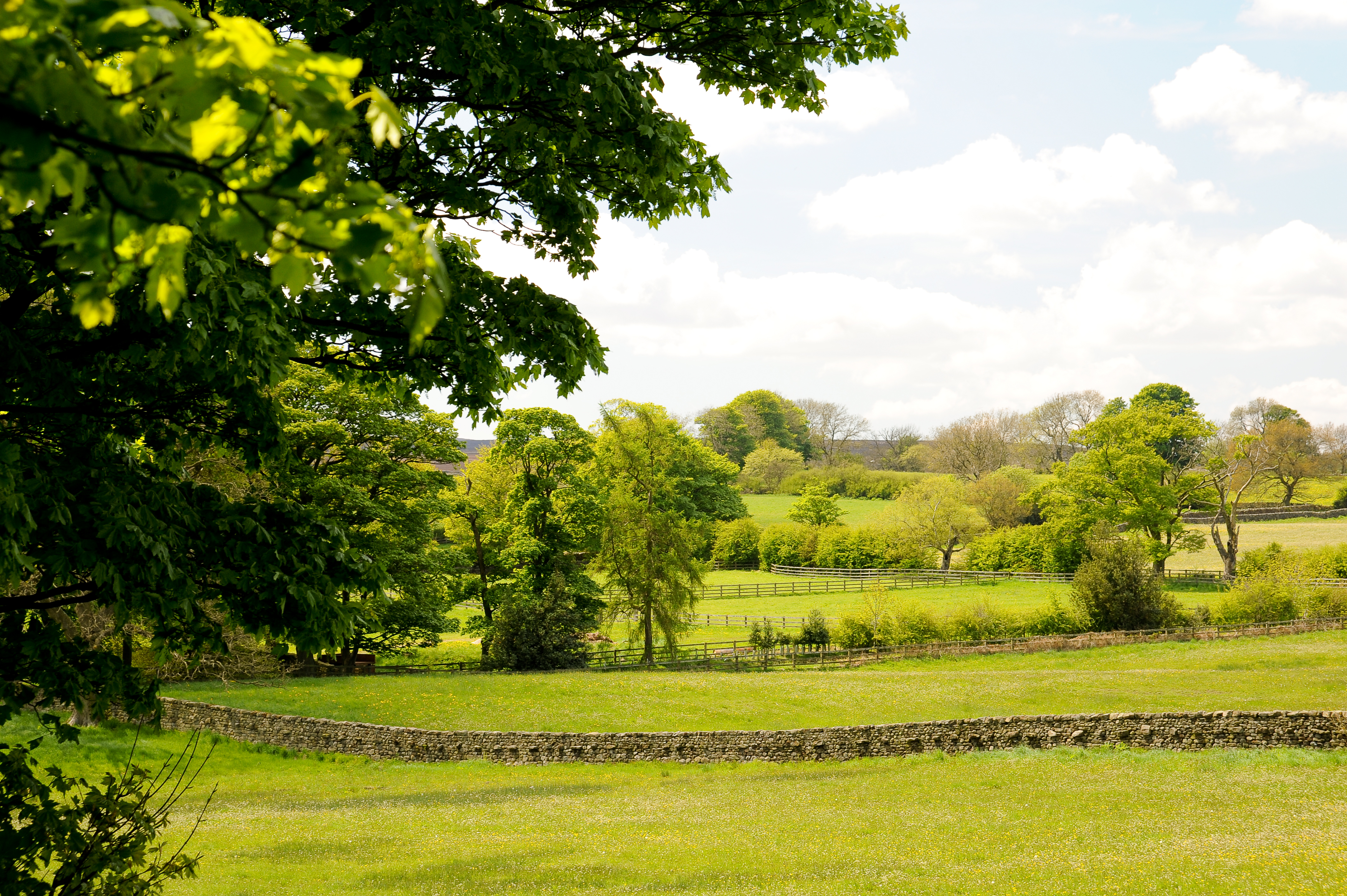
Bringing forward farmland sites to receive biodiversity offset credits will create the investment needed to improve biodiversity across large areas.

Biodiversity offsetting is a system used predominantly by planning authorities and developers to fully compensate for biodiversity impacts associated with economic development, through the planning process. In some circumstances, biodiversity offsets are designed to result in an overall biodiversity gain. Offsetting is generally considered the final stage in a mitigation hierarchy, whereby predicted biodiversity impacts must first be avoided, minimised and reversed by developers, before any remaining impacts are offset. The mitigation hierarchy serves to meet the environmental policy principle of "No Net Loss" of biodiversity alongside development.

Individuals or companies involved in arranging biodiversity offsets will use quantitative measures to determine the amount, type and quality of habitat that is likely to be affected by a proposed project. Then, they will establish a new location or locations (often called receptor sites) where it would be possible to re-create the same amount, type and quality of habitat. The aim of biodiversity offsets is not simply to provide financial compensation for the biodiversity losses associated with development, although developers might pay financial compensation in some cases if it can be demonstrated exactly what the physical biodiversity gains achieved by that compensation will be. The type of environmental compensation provided by biodiversity offsetting is different from biodiversity banking in that it must show both measurable and long-term biodiversity improvements, that can be demonstrated to counteract losses. However, there is so far mixed evidence that biodiversity offsets successfully counteract the biodiversity losses caused by associated developments, with evidence that offsets are generally more successful in less structurally-complex and more rapidly-recovering habitats such as loss of biodiversity simplified wetland habitats. For biodiversity offsets to successfully compensate for the loss of biodiversity elsewhere, it is necessary that they demonstrate additionality (i.e. they deliver an improvement in biodiversity that would not otherwise have occurred). While there are individual case studies of offsets that have successfully delivered additional outcomes, other evaluations of large-scale biodiversity offsetting markets have demonstrated serious additionality shortcomings.

== Terminology ==
Biodiversity offsets are defined by the Business and Biodiversity Offsets Programme as "measurable conservation outcomes of actions designed to compensate for significant residual adverse biodiversity impacts arising from project development after appropriate prevention and mitigation measures have been taken."

The definition also states that the goal of biodiversity offsets is to achieve no net loss of biodiversity, or ideally, a net gain. No net loss (NNL) is an environmental policy approach, defined as a goal for development projects/activities and policies where impacts on biodiversity are either counterbalanced or outweighed by measures to ensure that biodiversity is at the same level as it was before the project.

=== Related terms ===
Biodiversity offsetting may be confused with related terms like biodiversity banking. Biodiversity banking refers to a market-based mechanism, whereby offsets become assets in the form of biodiversity credits that can be traded to offset the debit of negative impacts of development. Biodiversity banks refer to sites where conservation or restoration activities have been carried out for the benefit of biodiversity. The positive outcomes for biodiversity or a given area of the bank is quantified in the form of a biodiversity credit.

In some languages, such as Spanish or Mandarin Chinese, biodiversity offsets are described as "compensation" because there is no corresponding term for offsetting. The term compensation is generally used more broadly in English to describe measures to counterbalance damages to biodiversity caused by development projects. Compensation does not necessarily require the aim of a no net loss goal, equivalence in biodiversity loss and gain, or measurable outcomes for conservation. Biodiversity offsets may therefore be seen as a more specific and outcome-oriented type of compensation measure.

The term "mitigation" is also sometimes used synonymously with offsetting, such as in the United States, where biodiversity offsetting is described by "compensatory mitigation". However, "mitigation" can be used to refer to the sequence of actions described by the mitigation hierarchy, a framework commonly used to guide the application of biodiversity offsetting within planning processes like Environmental Impact Assessments. The mitigation hierarchy describes a series of measures that should be applied in sequence to reduce impacts on biodiversity to the point where no adverse effects remain, often including the steps avoid, reduce, restore/rehabilitate, and offset. Offsetting is often regarded as the "final resort" in the mitigation hierarchy.

== Relevant conservation activities ==
Biodiversity offset projects can involve various management activities that can be demonstrated to deliver gains in biodiversity. These activities very often include active habitat restoration or creation projects (e.g. new wetland creation, grassland restoration). However, also viable are so-called "averted loss" biodiversity offsets, in which measures are taken to prevent ecological degradation from occurring where it almost certainly would have happened otherwise. Averted loss offsets might involve the creation of new protected areas (to conserve fauna species that would otherwise have disappeared), the removal of invasive species from areas of habitat (which otherwise would have reduced or displaced populations of native species), or positive measures to reduce extensive natural resource use (e.g. the offer of alternative livelihood creation to prevent activities leading to deforestation).

Any activities that do not result in a positive and measurable gain for biodiversity would not generally be counted as part of a biodiversity offset. For instance, if a developer funds ecological conservation research in a region that they are impacting through a project, would not count as an offset (unless it could be shown quantitatively how specific fauna and flora would benefit). instead, this would be a more general form of compensation. Note that biodiversity offsets can be considered a very specific, robust and transparent category of ecological compensation. Poorly designed offset policies may also create perverse incentives that lower conservation standards and unintentionally encourage further biodiversity decline.

== Receptor sites ==
Under many offset systems, receptor sites are areas of land put forward by companies or individuals looking to receive payment in return for creating (or restoring) biodiversity habitats on their property. The biodiversity restoration projects are financed by compensation from developers looking to offset their biodiversity impact. The resulting change in biodiversity levels at the new receptor sites should be equal to, or greater than, the losses at the original 'impact site'; In order to achieve no net loss – and preferably gain – of overall biodiversity. Such systems often rely on the buying (by developers) and selling (by landowners) of conservation credits.

However, characteristics of receptor sites can vary across different jurisdictions. In some countries, for instance, land is primarily state-owned, and so it is the government that owns and manages biodiversity offset projects. For biodiversity offsets in marine environments, receptor sites might be subject to multiple management organisations and not necessarily owned by anyone. Controversially, some biodiversity offsets use existing protected areas as receptor sites (i.e. improving the effectiveness of areas that are already managed for biodiversity conservation).

== Requirement to offset biodiversity ==
Biodiversity offset projects can be found on every major continent besides Antarctica. As of 2019, over 100 countries had, or were developing, policies for biodiversity offsetting and more than 37 countries required biodiversity offsets by law. These policies generally implement biodiversity offsetting within planning systems to compensate for unavoidable residual damage to biodiversity as the final step of a mitigation hierarchy, a tool to manage biodiversity risk. Where damage to biodiversity cannot be avoided or reduced, biodiversity offsetting may then be used as a conservation tool with the idea that development projects will result in either "no net loss", "net gain", or "net positive impact" of/on biodiversity.

The terms used to describe biodiversity offsetting and the method of implementation differ regionally. The term 'biodiversity offsetting' is generally used across Australia, New Zealand, South Africa, and the United Kingdom. However, different terms are used elsewhere:

Term(s) for biodiversity offsetting (English translation)	Country/countries
Biodiversity compensation	Argentina, Chile, Colombia, Kazakhstan, Mexico, Peru, Spain, Uzbekistan, Venezuela
Biodiversity offsetting	Australia, New Zealand, South Africa, UK
Compensation	Denmark, Sweden
Compensation measures	Canada, France, Germany, Madagascar
Compensatory mitigation	United States
Conservation offset	Canada
Ecological compensation	China
Environmental reserve certification	Brazil
Substitution, ecological/environmental compensation	Sweden

Biodiversity offsetting may also be required by lending institutions that co-finance developments. For example, any project financed by the International Finance Corporation (IFC) must deliver "no net loss" or "net gain" of biodiversity, required under the IFC's Performance Standard 6 (PS6). PS6 is regarded as influential and an example of best practice. However, as of 2019, only 8 offset projects had been implemented directly because of this requirement.

Finally, offset projects may arise from voluntary commitments made by corporations or across a sector. Only a small proportion of offsets arise in this way, but the projects generated tend to be larger than those arising from public policy requirements. For example, the Ambatovy mine in Madagascar uses voluntary avoided loss offsets to mitigate impacts on biodiversity by compensating for forest clearance at the mine. The project is on track to achieve no net loss, but the permanence of conservation outcomes achieved using its biodiversity offsets is not yet known.

=== Biodiversity compensation in Colombia ===
In Colombia, the equivalent term for biodiversity offsetting translates literally to biodiversity compensation (Spanish: compensaciones de biodiversidad). Principles to govern application of offsets have been established and, since 2012, the country has had a 'Biodiversity Offsetting Manual' (Spanish: Manual para la asignación de compensaciones por pérdida de biodiversidad) under Resolution 1517, with an updated manual released in 2018 under Resolution 256. Required principles to guide offset design include a no net loss objective, equivalence between the offset and impacted ecosystem, additionality, and a minimum duration of the length of the development project.

Several different regulations are in place to govern biodiversity offsets, including in relation to the environmental licensing system, forest reserve areas, harvesting of forests, and the exploitation of endangered species.

=== Biodiversity compensation in Peru ===
In Peru, the equivalent term for biodiversity offsetting literally translates to "biodiversity compensation" (Spanish: compensaciones de biodiversidad). The country has explicit legal frameworks requiring biodiversity offsetting for some projects subject to Environmental Impact Assessments (EIAs), under laws that govern environmental licensing. The term environmental licensing (Spanish: certifcación ambiental) is used to describe measures to evaluate or mitigate potential environmental impacts of developments.

The official guidelines on offsetting published by the SEIA (National Environmental Impact Assessment System,Spanish: Sistema Nacional de Evaluación de Impacto Ambiental) in 2015 require an objective of "no net loss" of biodiversity and ecosystem functionality, also requiring offsets to be based on principles of additionality, ecological equivalence, and compliance with the mitigation hierarchy. Offsets must last for the duration of the environmental impacts and must be in place when an environmental licence is approved.

=== Ecological compensation in China ===
In China, biodiversity offsetting is referred to using the term ecological compensation (simplified Chinese: 生态补偿机制; traditional Chinese: 生態補償機制; pinyin: shēngtài bǔcháng jīzhì), or eco-compensation. The system for biodiversity offsetting in China requires that developers complete an environmental impact assessment to determine the impact of their project, then choose either to offset the impacts themselves or pay the government to do it on their behalf. A goal similar to "no net loss", referred to as "maintain biodiversity" (simplified Chinese: 维护生物多样性; traditional Chinese: 維護生物多樣性; pinyin: wéihù shēngwù duōyàng xìng) is used in eco-compensation. However, offsets do not have to adhere to a "like for like" principle, where the offset is ecologically equivalent to the development site.

The term 'ecological compensation' takes on multiple meanings in Chinese environmental policy, including compensation for ongoing development impacts (equivalent to biodiversity offsetting policies in other countries), compensation for previous development impacts, payments for ecosystem services, and compensation for illegal use of natural resources. In the context of biodiversity offsetting, compensation involves mitigation of negative impacts on biodiversity arising from development projects by enhancing biodiversity elsewhere, typically aiming for "no net loss" or "net positive" biodiversity outcomes.

With the aim of reversing the habitat destruction caused by rapid expansion of infrastructure, the Chinese Government first launched its eco-compensation scheme between the late 1990s and early 2000s. Some of the biodiversity offsetting mechanisms used in China include the forestry vegetation restoration fee (FVRF), grassland vegetation restoration fee (GVRF, simplified Chinese: 草原植被恢复费), and wetland restoration fee (WRF).

The forestry vegetation restoration fee (FVRF) (simplified Chinese: 森林植被恢复费) was the earliest ecological compensation mechanism developed in China and widely regarded as China's principal "no net loss" (NNL) instrument because it incorporates a legal commitment to no net loss of forest cover. This means that developments (such as mining operations) occupying forest land with approval from the National Forestry and Grassland Administration should pay fees to restore this vegetation. FVRFs were launched in 1998 as part of China's first Forestry Law, which established "a compensation fund for the benefit of the forest ecology". They are also the most widely used compensation mechanism in China. This is because of a policy focus on prioritising forest protection and afforestation to promote sustainability. By contrast, WRF is in its infancy and GVRF has only been applied to some regions.

Eco-compensation in China is criticised for the substantial degree of government participation through use of public funds as finance sources. On the other hand, government participation is also regarded as important in developing countries to ensure that biodiversity offset projects operate smoothly. In addition, there is no standardised measurement for compensation programmes and quantitative metrics to determine impact on biodiversity are not mandated.

=== Compensatory mitigation in the US ===
Biodiversity offsetting tends to come under the term "compensatory mitigation" in the United States, where biodiversity offsetting and its objective of "no net loss" originated. Compensatory mitigation (in the wetlands context) is defined by the United States Department of Agriculture (USDA) as "mitigation that offsets unavoidable impacts to wetlands or other aquatic resources in advance." This is achieved through restoration, creation, enhancement, or preservation.

The most common mechanism for compensatory mitigation in the United States is mitigation banking - a concept that has since been expanded to create other forms of biodiversity banking, such as conservation banking and habitat banking. Mitigation banking is a market-based system to compensate for manipulation of wetlands (or other aquatic resources, like streams) through restoration, creation, or enhancement of wetlands at mitigation banks that generate credits. Credits can be purchased by developers to offset/compensate for the debit incurred by unavoidable adverse impacts to wetlands.

Section 404 of the Clean Water Act forms the legal basis of wetland mitigation banking in the United States, administered by the US Army Corps of Engineers and overseen by the Environmental Protection Agency.

=== Offsetting in Australia ===
In Australia, biodiversity offsetting has been applied since at least 2001, under the conditions of the Environment Protection and Biodiversity Conservation Act 1999 (EPBC Act). At federal and state/territory levels, policies have been established to regulate biodiversity offsetting; potential biodiversity offsets may need approval both under the EPBC Act and under the policies of the state/territory where the development is occurring. As well, much of the scientific research into biodiversity offsetting outside of the US has been conducted by Australia, especially organisations such as CEED and CSIRO.

The Environment Protection and Biodiversity Conservation Act 1999 (EPBC Act) regulates biodiversity offsetting at the federal level and forms the basis of the government's 'Environmental Offsets Policy'. Under the EPBC Act, if a proposed development (such as housing developments, mining projects, or road construction) is likely to have an impact on a protected area, an Environmental Impact Assessment must be conducted. Offsetting can be carried out, as part of a mitigation hierarchy, to compensate for adverse impacts that cannot be avoided or minimised.

The involvement of the federal government is limited to matters of national environmental significance, known as 'protected matters' under the EPBC Act. For example, potential adverse impacts on biodiversity where world heritage properties, wetlands of international importance under the Ramsar convention, and listed threatened species are concerned. Offsets are applied to nearly 80% of approved actions in Australia under the legal conditions of the EPBC Act, according to a report by the Australian National Audit Office in 2020.

==== State and territory offsetting requirements ====
State and territory governments within Australia have established their own biodiversity offsetting policies, including in the Federal Capital Territory, New South Wales, Queensland, Victoria, Western Australia, and the Northern Territory - in Tasmania, biodiversity offsetting policy is only applied in specific contexts.

Biodiversity banking mechanisms are also operated on a regional level within Australia. Biodiversity banking involves the generation of biodiversity credits (as proxies for biodiversity) from assessing the biodiversity value of land where conservation activities to restore or manage habitats have been conducted. These sites, located away from the development site, are known as 'biobanks'. The biodiversity credits generated from biobanks can then be traded within a market framework to deliver biodiversity offsets that aim to mitigate the negative impacts of development projects.

=== Offsetting in Germany ===
Germany has had legal requirements for biodiversity offsetting since 1976 and, in a 2016 report by the OECD, was described as "one of the few countries with a long history of requiring compensation measures for ecological harm caused by development projects". These requirements arise from the Federal Nature Conservation Act 1976, which includes Impact Mitigation Regulations (IMR, German: Eingriffsregelung) that require offsets where 'natural assets' (e.g. flora, fauna, soil, water, climate, etc) and their functions are impacted.

Originally, Impact Mitigation Regulations required that developers compensated for impacts themselves. This was expected to occur through habitat restoration to compensate for impacts by targeting the same aspects of biodiversity as the project negatively and unavoidably impacted. However, later amendments allowed for compensation to also be carried out away from the site of impact through private habitat banks. Habitat banks are a form of biodiversity banking, known in Germany either as compensation pools (German: Flächenpools) or eco-accounts (German: Ökokonten). This is a market-based system for offsets where developers can compensate for their impacts by purchasing credits from a third-party that represent ecologically equivalent habitat restoration that has already been conducted by government-paid landowners.

=== Offsetting in South Africa ===
South Africa has a legal framework to govern the implementation of biodiversity offsetting through the National Environmental Management Act (NEMA) and the Environmental Impact Assessment Regulations (EIAR), though the term is not explicitly mentioned in these laws.

NEMA puts forward a polluter pays principle, which could be implemented using biodiversity offsetting, and requires developers to consider the need to avoid, or to minimise and remedy (where avoidance is not possible), the loss of biodiversity, as part of sustainable development. The EIAR includes implicit legal provisions for the use of offsets. These laws form the foundation of the 'National Biodiversity Offset Guideline', issued by the Ministry of Forestry, Fisheries & the Environment in January 2023. According to these guidelines, biodiversity offsets are required when it is likely that a proposed activity could have residual negative impacts on biodiversity of "medium or high significance" (where biodiversity may be lost in vulnerable areas, or areas of recognised importance), once measures have been taken to avoid or minimise these impacts.

The implementation of a national guideline on biodiversity offsetting was recommended by the National Biodiversity Framework (2019-2024). In response to the recommendation, the 'National Biodiversity Offset Guideline' was released by the Ministry of Forestry, Fisheries & the Environment to guide the implementation of EIAR and NEMA. It provides guidance on the principles of biodiversity offsets, the requirements for biodiversity offsets, biodiversity offsets in the context of Environmental Impact Assessments, selection of sites, and planning. The principles of the guideline acknowledge offsetting as the last step of the mitigation hierarchy, a preference for ecological equivalence of offsets, and the need for offsets to be additional to conservation measures that are already legally required. It does not mention "no net loss" or "net positive impact" as goals for biodiversity, instead discussing the need to "counterbalance a residual impact".

==== Provincial offsetting guidelines ====
In addition to national guidelines, some South African provinces have their own offsetting guidelines. The first to develop a biodiversity offsetting framework was the Western Cape Province with the Provincial Biodiversity Offsetting Guideline. The KwaZulu-Natal and Gauteng provinces have also published guidelines for biodiversity offsetting and other provinces are drafting their own policies.

Guidelines in the Western Cape Province require developers to compensate for residual impacts on biodiversity and ecosystem services, as part of the environmental impact assessment process. However, if a project proposal is deemed to be fatally flawed (it has a major defect that should result in its rejection) through its impact on biodiversity, this means that offsets cannot be applied. Like national guidelines, the Western Cape's guidelines do not use the goal of "no net loss" to guide ambitions for offsets because it is considered to be unrealistic as a result of South Africa's status as a developing country. Instead, the guideline attaches offset requirements to an acceptable loss of threatened vegetation types and ecosystem services.

The use of biodiversity offsetting in South Africa has attracted debate. A range of barriers to effective implementation have been identified by researchers. For example, the lack of common understanding of the theory and practical application of biodiversity offsetting within the country is a particular challenge.

=== Offsetting in Sweden ===
In Sweden, biodiversity offsetting is commonly discussed under the broader concept of ecological compensation. The concept is intended to address residual biodiversity losses that remain after avoidance and minimisation measures have been implemented in accordance with the mitigation hierarchy.

Implementation has historically been considered fragmented and largely case-specific, with limited standardisation of quantitative assessment methods. Several studies have identified the lack of consistent valuation methods as a challenge for achieving measurable no net loss outcomes.

A commonly used basis for biodiversity assessment is the Nature Value Inventory (Naturvärdesinventering, NVI), a standardized field survey methodology developed under Swedish standards for identifying and classifying natural values prior to land-use change. NVI data are frequently used in environmental impact assessments and ecological compensation planning.

To quantify biodiversity losses and gains associated with development projects, some practitioners use metric-based approaches derived from biodiversity metric methodologies. One example is the CLIMB model, which is intended to calculate biodiversity values within a geographic area. The model has primarily been applied in sectors such as infrastructure, mining, energy development and spatial planning, and is intended to support assessments of no net loss or net gain outcomes in ecological compensation processes.

=== Offsetting in Uganda ===
Legal provisions for biodiversity offsets have been introduced in Uganda under the National Environment Act (NEA) 2019 with the goal of achieving no net loss, and aspiring to net gain. In addition, Uganda has published a 'National Biodiversity and Social Offset Strategy' and a 'National Biodiversity Strategy and Action Plan' for 2015-2025 which mentions biodiversity offsets.

The NEA puts forward principles of environmental management that include a requirement to apply the mitigation hierarchy in environmental and social impact assessments (ESIA). The Act requires biodiversity offsets to be designed to address residual impacts, achieve measurable conservation outcomes, and adhere to the "like-for-like or better" principle. According to the "like-for-like or better principle" offsets must provide outcomes for biodiversity that are either equivalent to or better the biodiversity lost. Developers are also required to monitor projects to ensure that mitigation measures are effective and that offsets achieve NNL, as part of the Act.

Prior to government policy requirements, biodiversity offset projects had been implemented in Uganda as part of lending requirements from the World Bank. For example, creation of an offset between Kalagala Falls and Itanda Falls on the River Nile to mitigate the negative impacts of the Bujagali Hydroelectric Power Station, agreed between the government of Uganda and the World Bank as a condition for financing a dam at Bujagali Falls in 2007. Bujagali Falls was flooded as a result of the project. This was criticised for its impacts on biodiversity, the tourism industry that relied on recreational activities there, and because Bujagali Falls had spiritual importance for local people. The government later broke the offset agreement in the area when it supported the construction of the Isimba Hydroelectric Power (started in 2013 and now complete) within the Kalagala-Itanda offset area.

=== Offsetting in the UK ===
==== Biodiversity Net Gain in England ====
Biodiversity offsetting has been formally implemented into the planning process in England through the introduction of Biodiversity Net Gain (BNG) on February 12, 2024 under the Environment Act 2021 through modification to the Town and Country Planning Act. BNG is England's domestic ecological compensation policy, designed to compensate for ecological harms caused by new developments. BNG requires that, to gain planning permission from Local Planning Authorities (LPAs), developers must demonstrate a 10% net gain in biodiversity under the proposed development, relative to the pre-development scenario, using a 'Statutory Biodiversity Metric'.

The statutory requirement does not apply uniformly to all forms of development, with exemptions and transitional arrangements for certain small developments, permitted development rights, and nationally significant infrastructure projects.

Failure to meet this criterion obligates the developer to adjust their project plan, or compensate for the shortfall in biodiversity units through the purchase of biodiversity offsets, which are delivered either through a payment to the council or a third party, such as a broker managing a habitat bank. If no compensation sites are available within the local planning authority where the development is planned, compensation is permitted in other local authorities, triggering an increase in compensatory units required due to a spatial multiplier within the Metric. As a final option, developers can purchase 'statutory biodiversity credits' from the national government. Offsetting therefore represents a small proportion of biodiversity enhancements delivered through the policy; the majority of biodiversity enhancements come through habitat management activities implemented within the boundaries of new developments themselves.

Assessments for Biodiversity Net Gain are conventionally integrated into the Ecological Impact Assessment (EcIA) process. This involves using data gathered from pre-development ecological surveys and processing it through the Statutory Biodiversity Metric (an Excel-based tool), to give a measure of the ecological value of a site in 'biodiversity units'. The metric uses habitat as a proxy for biodiversity by combining factors like area, habitat condition, distinctiveness, and multiple parameters (like risk, the time required for habitat development, and the ecological significance of the site on a landscape scale) for each habitat section within the development area. Using the metric, an overall biodiversity score, measured in biodiversity units, is generated. Baseline biodiversity units within the development area and associated compensation areas owned or managed by developers are compared with anticipated biodiversity units following development. For example, if a develop damages a habitat of "high distinctiveness", they will be required to compensate with habitat of the same type, instead of trading for a less ecologically-valuable habitat.

Preliminary scientific evidence on the ecological outcomes of Biodiversity Net Gain suggests the policy facilitates the trade of habitat losses from construction for smaller, but more ecologically valuable habitats to be delivered in the future. There are concerns that the monitoring and evaluation of the biodiversity benefits delivered through the policy is insufficient to ensure these future biodiversity outcomes are effectively secured. Because of this, it is thought that enforcing the policy's use by developers will be a challenge.

Additionally, there are concerns that the Biodiversity Metric may not be an effective proxy for biodiversity, and therefore that a net gain in biodiversity demonstrated by the metric may not translate into real-world improvements in biodiversity such as wildlife populations.

==== Prior to Biodiversity Net Gain ====
Prior to this policy, developers could voluntarily incorporate offsets into project plans after following a mitigation hierarchy to manage risk to biodiversity by taking steps to avoid and minimise ecological harm at the development site, unless legally required for impacts to protected sites and species.

The Lawton Review in 2010 proposed that biodiversity offsets established through planning processes could be used to enhance ecological networks, but warned that biodiversity offsetting must not become 'a licence to destroy'. At the time the report was written, offsetting was mandatory only in areas where a development of great public interest would have a significant impact on the European Union's Natura 2000 network or any site inhabited by a European protected species. The Review recommended the establishment of pilot schemes to test potential biodiversity offsetting systems in the country. A 2011 white paper 'The natural choice: securing the value of nature' responded to the Lawton review and announced plans to introduce voluntary biodiversity offsetting through pilot schemes.

In April 2012, the Department for Environment, Food, and Rural Affairs (Defra) launched a voluntary biodiversity offsetting pilot scheme. Developers in pilot areas were required to provide compensation for biodiversity loss under planning policy and were able to choose offsetting to do so. The scheme also aimed to test a biodiversity offsetting metric developed by Defra. This scheme included 6 pilot areas: Doncaster, Devon, Essex, Greater Norwich, Nottinghamshire, and Warwickshire. In March 2014, the pilot scheme ended and was reviewed by Collingwood Environmental Planning Limited in partnership with the Institute for European Environmental Policy (IEEP). However, the scheme also drew criticism from Friends of the Earth who described it as a "licence to destroy" and the possibility of like-for-like compensation of biodiversity loss has been questioned.

In 2012, a standard metric for biodiversity was piloted by Defra for use in the biodiversity offsetting pilot scheme. Consultation from environment, planning, land management, academic, and development sectors led to numerous updated biodiversity metrics over a period of several years. Biodiversity Metric 4.0 was launched by Defra and Natural England in March 2023 to measure Biodiversity Net Gain. A Statutory Biodiversity Metric was later introduced as part of the Environment Act as the legally mandated metric for use under the biodiversity net gain policy. This metric uses habitat as a proxy for biodiversity by combining factors like area, habitat condition, distinctiveness, and multiple parameters (like risk, the time required for habitat development, and the ecological significance of the site on a landscape scale) for each habitat section within the development area.

The Government announced plans to mandate a biodiversity net gain policy in England in March 2019, as part of an Environment Bill that would require 'developers to ensure habitats for wildlife are enhanced and left in a measurably better state than they were pre-development'. The Bill was later enacted as the Environment Act 2021. Initially, BNG was planned to come into force by November 2023, but delays meant that it was not implemented until February 12, 2024. This delay was criticised by environmentalists, including The Wildlife Trusts, who called it "another hammer blow for nature." In response to these criticisms, a government spokesman reaffirmed the government's commitment to BNG, saying that "we are fully committed to biodiversity net gain which will have benefits for people and nature."

== Economic value ==
Biodiversity is increasingly seen as having economic value due to growing recognition of the world's finite natural resources and through the benefits of ecosystem services (nature providing clean air, food and water, natural flood defences, pollination services and recreation opportunity). Placing financial value on biodiversity has created a marketplace for retaining and restoring habitats.

Financial gain from biodiversity offsetting is brought about through the sale of conservation credits by landowners through biodiversity banking mechanisms. Individuals or companies who are looking to receive financial payment in return for creating or enhancing particular wildlife habitats on their property can have their land valued in conservation credits by a biodiversity offsetting broker who will then register their credits for sale to developers looking to offset any residual impact to biodiversity from their approved developments.

Developers can also find the business of biodiversity offsetting appealing financially as the compensation payment for their project's residual biodiversity impact is handled in one agreement and the landowner receiving that payment (and therefore the habitat re-creation duties) is responsible for the biodiversity restoration and management thereafter. The cost may represent a small proportion of a developer's budget and is often outweighed by a project's long-term gains. As corporate social responsibility is often part of larger companies' business priorities, being able to demonstrate environmentally responsible practices can be an additional incentive.

Biodiversity offsetting based upon showing the economic value of lost habitat is highly controversial. The schemes proposed for the UK have been regarded as failing to protect biodiversity and indeed leading to further losses in the prioritisation of development over conservation. The basic economics has been described by ecological economist Clive Spash as leading to the "bulldozing of biodiversity" under an approach that regards optimal species extinction as being necessary to achieve economic efficiency.

=== Conservation credits ===
The cost of re-creating an area of habitat affected by a development proposal (impact site) can be calculated and represented as a number of conservation credits that a developer could purchase in order to offset their biodiversity impact. Land put forward for investment to re-create impacted biodiversity (receptor site) is also calculated in conservation credits (to account for the cost of creating or restoring biodiversity at that particular site and to cover the cost of its long-term conservation management). This situation enables the buying (by developers) and selling (by landowners) of conservation credits. Government approved (quantitative and qualitative) metrics should be used to calculate the number of conservation credits that can be applied to each site, in order to maintain accuracy and consistency in the value of a conservation credit.

== Motivation ==
A decline in global biodiversity is being driven, partially, by land-use changes, including for the purpose of developing infrastructure. Reconciling economic development with the need to conserve biodiversity can therefore be a challenge, particularly in developing countries. The need to address this decline acted as a motivation for creating a system within the planning process that tackles unavoidable and residual impacts to biodiversity.

Putting this into practice often involves formal evaluation of possible impacts on wildlife (and their habitat) at a potential development site before developers can receive approval. This may occur in the form of Environmental Impact Assessments (EIA), which look at how proposed projects would impact the environment (including biodiversity) at the development site in conjunction with social and economic issues. EIAs have become widespread within the work of government planning authorities. In some jurisdictions, they are legally required and these requirements often motivate the use of biodiversity offsetting.

The approval of a project proposal may depend upon the use of measures to mitigate its potential impacts. A package of measures, including biodiversity offsetting, could be recommended as part of the EIA process. The mitigation hierarchy is commonly applied to EIAs to guide the mitigation of negative impacts on biodiversity. The mitigation hierarchy is a framework of sequential steps (avoid, reduce/minimise, restore/rehabilitate, and offset) and biodiversity offsetting is its final step to counterbalance impacts that cannot be avoided or reduced.

== Critique ==
Biodiversity offsetting is a subject of significant debate. Challenges associated with putting offsets into practice and governing them effectively have been recognised by both supporters and opponents of the concept. For example, some of these challenges include: application of the mitigation hierarchy in practice, monitoring and evaluation programmes to track whether offsets are meeting targets, and the metrics used as a proxy for biodiversity losses and gains. There is disagreement when it comes to whether offsets are feasible or acceptable as a tool for conserving biodiversity.

No net loss (NNL), commonly used as an objective for biodiversity offsets, is one reason for debate. A no net loss goal requires that biodiversity loss in one area is counterbalanced by potential but uncertain gains in another area. A review of research conducted to determine the success of no net loss policies found that around one-third of NNL policies and individual biodiversity offsets reported achieving no net loss.

Concerns have been raised over the feasibility of achieving NNL because of the complex nature of biodiversity in all of its aspects (such as species diversity, genetic diversity, etc.), meaning that efforts to quantify biodiversity and determine the equivalence between biodiversity in two different areas to determine losses and gains may be regarded as either difficult or impossible. Further concerns have been expressed over substitution of biodiversity in a specific place for efforts to conserve biodiversity elsewhere, given that biodiversity can have a place-based cultural and spiritual value for humans but also because of a view of biodiversity as having an intrinsic value outside of benefits to humans.

For the reasons mentioned above and others, critics have argued that offsetting is an ethically misguided process. For example, it has been argued that biodiversity offsetting legitimises ongoing habitat destruction and promotes the "bulldozing of biodiversity". A similar view is taken by the environmental organisation Friends of the Earth, who oppose the use of biodiversity offsets and have expressed concern at the use of measurable units to value nature. Biodiversity offsetting has also been described by critics as a "licence to trash".

Some have argued that the debate on biodiversity offsetting also forms part of a wider discussion on the ethics of economically valuing biodiversity and the application of neoliberal principles to biodiversity conservation.

== See also ==
- Biodiversity
- Biodiversity banking
- Cross-sector biodiversity initiative
- Economics of biodiversity
- Ecosystem services
- Mitigation banking
- No net loss
- Environmental mitigation
