= No net loss =

Environmental policy approach

"No net loss" (NNL) is an environmental policy approach that aims to counterbalance the negative impacts of development projects on the environment by using environmental mitigation measures. For example, the policy aims for no net loss of wetlands in the United States (where it originated) or no net loss of biodiversity in other regions. It is now used in many countries as an objective for biodiversity offsetting, such as in Colombia, France, and Uganda. Its application and feasibility for conserving biodiversity is a subject of debate.

NNL is implemented in planning processes via Environmental Impact Assessments (EIAs), which assess the potential for significant adverse impacts on the environment resulting from proposed developments and determine how environmental mitigation can be used to reach no net loss. The mitigation hierarchy is generally used as a sequential framework to guide the implementation of measures to achieve NNL. It varies regionally but often includes the steps avoidance, minimisation, restoration, and offsetting.

== Definition ==
"No net loss" is defined by the International Finance Corporation as "the point at which the project-related impacts on biodiversity are balanced by measures taken to avoid and minimize the project's impacts, to understand on site restoration and finally to offset significant residual impacts, if any, on an appropriate geographic scale (e.g local, landscape-level, national, regional)."

Where the aim is for biodiversity levels to exceed their previous state, a goal of "net gain" (NG) or "net positive impact" (NPI) might be used instead of "no net loss". For example, the Biodiversity Net Gain policy in England requires a 10% net gain in biodiversity or habitat compared to the previous state. NPI also differs from NNL in that it is generally applied in the context of a development project, whereas NNL is applied on various geographic scales.

== Background ==
No net loss originated in 1980s in the United States, where it was developed as a policy goal for wetland conservation by the National Wetlands Policy Forum. During his campaign for the 1988 United States presidential election, George H. W. Bush promised "no net loss of wetlands" as a national goal. No net loss has since been used as a goal for wetland compensatory mitigation in the US - a practice that describes actions to restore, establish, or enhance wetland habitat to offset unavoidable adverse impacts that might occur from activities like dredging, filling, or building infrastructure. Its use has been expanded beyond just wetlands and now is a goal for conserving other habitats, such as forests.

Growing awareness of the global decline in biodiversity has led to increasing no net loss requirements and corporate commitments. Through land-use change and other factors, economic development is playing a role in driving biodiversity loss but remains important for many of the world's most biodiverse countries. Stopping biodiversity loss (on land and sea) and developing infrastructure are part of the United Nations' Sustainable Development Goals and no net loss policies have therefore been suggested as a way to reconcile these goals.

== Critique ==
No net loss has been the subject of significant debate and has also been described as a "buzz phrase" in environmental policy because of its increasing use. There are a range of opinions on no net loss, including in relation to the feasibility of achieving the goal and the acceptability of substituting losses for uncertain gains in biodiversity or habitat.

No net loss has been rejected as an impossible or unacceptable goal for biodiversity by some, including for social, ecological, or cultural reasons, while others regard it as a potential tool to reconcile infrastructure development and biodiversity loss. The complexity of biodiversity means that exactly recreating or preserving its structure elsewhere may be regarded as impossible or highly challenging. It is also argued that biodiversity has an integral value in and of itself, as well as a place-based spiritual and cultural value for humans that means it is regarded as concerning or unacceptable to substitute biodiversity loss in one area with attempts to conserve it elsewhere, such as through biodiversity offsetting.

The implementation of NNL also faces challenges. For example, the baseline to compare gains and losses may not be defined or the components and process of ecosystems and species being targeted may not be stated. The use of metrics to quantify losses and gains is required to determine whether no net loss is being achieved but there is no agreement on the metric that should be used to do this.

== By country ==
No net loss policies have become widespread - by 2018, they were in place in at least 69 countries. Requirements for NNL are often included as part of biodiversity offsetting policies or regulations for environmental impact assessments. In jurisdictions that do not legally require NNL, it might be used by companies as a voluntary goal for their developments instead. Some lending institutions, such as the International Finance Corporation, also require no net loss on projects they co-finance.

=== United States ===
The idea of "no net loss" emerged in the United States as a goal for applying environmental mitigation measures (such as mitigation banking) to wetland conservation. This was motivated by the historic and ongoing loss of wetlands - over half of the original wetlands in the lower 48 states have been lost. A national policy of no net loss of wetlands was adopted by President George H. W. Bush, who first pledged the policy on the Presidential campaign trail in 1988. It has since been developed under subsequent administrations.

No net loss of "wetland acreage and function" is used as the goal for compensatory mitigation measures, including mitigation banking. It has been included as part of guidance from the USEPA and USACE (the government agencies that regulate compensatory mitigation in the country) since 1990. A study that evaluated the achievement of no net loss under mitigation banking practices found that it was resulting in a net loss of wetland area across the country, though the study did not investigate whether no net loss of function was being achieved.

=== Australia ===
Under the government's 'Nature Positive Plan', Australia has a national goal to achieve no net loss (described as "zero net loss") and plans to transition to a "net positive" objective had been announced by July 2024. In addition, under the Environment Protection and Biodiversity Conservation Act 1996 and the 'Environmental Offsets Policy', to be acceptable, a biodiversity offset must meet the target of no net loss. Despite these requirements, a review of the country's offsets system in 2020 found that net losses were occurring and concerns were also raised over administration of offsets.

Since the early 2000s, some Australian states have had their own no net loss policies as part of biodiversity offset schemes, either as a regulatory requirement or a voluntary commitment. For example, the BioBanking program in New South Wales established in 2008 or the Native Vegetation Management Framework (NVMF) that ran from 2002 to 2013 in Victoria. A study to evaluate the impact of the NVMF found that up to 86% of offsets under the scheme did not compensate for impacts to native vegetation in the state, suggesting that the NNL goal was not achieved.

=== Colombia ===
Colombia was one of the first countries in Latin America to explicitly require no net loss, in addition to Peru. NNL is part of biodiversity offsetting and habitat banking regulations released by the Ministry of Environment and Sustainable Development. Under these regulations, all projects that need environmental licences must achieve "no net loss", guided by the application of the mitigation hierarchy as a further requirement.

The methods set out to achieve the no net loss policy, including habitat banks, have been criticised as a way of commodifying wildlife and prioritising profit over ecological benefits.

=== France ===
No net loss of biodiversity is required in France under the law on biodiversity no. 2016–1087. This might be applied to particular habitats or species and there are also regional variations in the application of the policy. As a framework for achieving no net loss, the mitigation hierarchy is part of France's Environmental Impact Assessment laws, referred to as the ERC sequence (Avoid-Reduce-Compensate, French: éviter-réduire-compenser). The policy is yet to achieve no net loss in practice.

As a member state of the European Union, France is also subject to the Nature Restoration Law, which includes a target of "no net loss of green urban space and tree cover by 2030". The law has been criticised by some as unrealistic.

=== Madagascar ===
There are no legal requirements for no net loss in Madagascar, however, offsets have been used by mining companies to compensate for environmental impacts there as part of voluntary commitments.

The Ambatovy mine in Madagascar was on track to achieve its goal of no net loss of forests by using biodiversity offsets according to research by scientists at the University of Bangor. However, the study was unable to determine whether there was no net loss of biodiversity there and concerns were raised that these offsets might restrict the ability of Malagasy people to access forest resources.

=== Uganda ===
The National Environment Act 2019 requires no net loss (but preferably a net gain) as a goal for biodiversity offsets and biodiversity conservation in the country. Before these legal requirements were introduced, a no net loss goal had been used by the World Bank as a lending requirement to fund a dam at Bujagali Falls in 2007.

Uganda has a 'National Biodiversity and Social Offset Strategy' (NBSOS) that discusses requirements for achieving "no net loss for people and biodiversity" as part of the Environmental and Social Impact Assessment (ESIAs) process. ESIAs assess the potential social and environmental impacts of a proposed development, as part of the planning process. The principle of "no net loss for people and biodiversity" is based on the idea that the wellbeing of people living near a development site should be no worse off because of activities to achieve NNL. The NBSOS discusses the potential impacts of activities used to achieve NNL on local communities, in terms of how impacts to biodiversity affect wellbeing and other social values.

== See also ==
- No net loss policy in the United States
- Biodiversity loss
- Environmental mitigation
- Biodiversity offsetting
