= Biodiversity banking =

Market-based system for biodiversity offsetting

Biodiversity banking, also known as biodiversity trading, conservation banking, mitigation banking, habitat banking, compensatory habitat, or set-asides, describes a market-based framework for biodiversity offsetting where offsets can be traded in the form of credits to offset negative environmental impacts of development projects or activities. This involves biodiversity banks, areas with biodiversity value. On the site of a biodiversity bank, conservation activities may be carried out to preserve, restore, enhance, or conserve biodiversity. The outcomes of projects carried out at biodiversity banks are valued in the form of credits, which can be purchased as a way to offset unavoidable adverse environmental impacts, often with the aim of achieving no net loss of biodiversity.

Biodiversity banking emerged from wetland mitigation banking in the United States, beginning in the 1980s and arising from the no net loss policies developed with the Clean Water Act in the 1970s. Since then the concept has been extended, including its application to the bond market.

The terms used to describe biodiversity banking are dependent on the focus of conservation aims and the policies of the country or region in which it is applied. Some of the countries where biodiversity banking has been implemented include the United States, Australia, Canada, Brazil, Sri Lanka and Colombia .

== Terminology ==
Biodiversity banking is distinct from biodiversity offsets, though they are closely related. Biodiversity offsets are measurable conservation outcomes that result from actions to compensate for the significant negative impacts of development projects, once appropriate measures to avoid or minimise these impacts have been taken. Biodiversity offsetting and biodiversity banking are commonly applied with the goal of achieving no net loss of biodiversity, or more ambitiously, a net gain of biodiversity.

Biodiversity banking generally turns offsets into assets that can be stored or traded, through the creation of biodiversity credits that quantify the value of projects undertaken to restore, create, or enhance biodiversity in advance of a development and away from its potential site. The sites where these projects are carried out are referred to as banks. While more than 100 countries have developed requirements for biodiversity offsetting, frameworks for biodiversity banking are less widespread.

The terms used to describe biodiversity banking differ according to the biodiversity that the system aims to conserve. For example, habitat banking, species banking, conservation banking, and mitigation banking are forms of biodiversity banking.

== Legal protections ==
Biodiversity banks and the credits that are generated from them rely on regulations and legal frameworks. When establishing a biodiversity bank, a legal arrangement, such as a conservation easement (also known as a conservation covenant) might be required to set aside the land for conservation and prevent the use of the land for development, either in perpetuity or for a specified time period. This commitment remains in place for future owners of the land. Part of the agreement may involve establishing a trust fund dedicated to funding ongoing conservation on the site and monitoring its outcomes.

== Conservation activities ==
To generate credits, conservation activities must be carried out at the site of a potential biodiversity bank so that the credits represent improved outcomes for biodiversity that would not have otherwise happened. This might include activities to preserve, enhance, restore, or create habitat on the site.

On a practical level, this might involve reintroducing native plant species that had disappeared from the area, removing invasive species, or removing ditches and levees to restore a swamp. The exact methods used at a habitat bank for restoring or conserving biodiversity will vary depending on the type of habitat being targeted for conservation.

== Country examples ==
=== United States ===
In the United States, a mitigation banking process applies to impacts on wetlands and other aquatic habitats like streams. This involves a mitigation sequence, which requires that developers firstly avoid harm to wetlands, but if harm is considered unavoidable, then wetland habitat of similar function and values must be protected, enhanced, restored, or created to compensate for those that will be damaged. The process comes under the section 404 of the US Clean Water Act 1972, the US Army Corps of Engineers regulations and the commitment to "no net loss" of wetlands habitat.

As part of mitigation banking, compensation for impacts to river banks, known as "stream riparian zones", may be required. Dedicated stream mitigation banks may be established for compensate for impacts to streams, such as loss of ecological and hydrological functions. In practice, impacts might result from activities like sedimentation, channelization, dredging, or similar activities. They might also come from agricultural activities or addition of structures to the river bank, such as concrete or rip rap. The suitability of using mitigation banking to compensate for these impacts will depend on the amount of the river bank (considered in terms of "linear distance" in feet) that is impacted - there must be the potential to enhance or restore at least 4,000 linear feet (1219.2 meters) of degraded first or second order streams to establish a stream mitigation bank.

Conservation banking (also called species banking) is another form of biodiversity banking used in the United States. It is used to compensate for impacts on species of special concern, typically those that are listed by state and federal agencies under the U.S. Endangered Species Act or its state-based equivalent. The wetland mitigation banking system inspired the development of conservation banking in California in the mid-1990s but, unlike mitigation banking, conservation banking does not require "no net loss".

=== Australia ===
At least two biodiversity banking schemes have been set up in Australia as a framework for biodiversity offsetting. Biodiversity offsetting is required under the federal Environment Protection and Biodiversity Conservation Act and state guidelines for offsetting. Biodiversity banks were established on the state level based on regulations from state governments - for example, New South Wales' now defunct BioBanking Scheme set up in 2008 and the BushBroker scheme in Victoria.

==== BioBanking in New South Wales ====
The BioBanking ('Biodiversity Banking and Offsets') scheme in New South Wales started in July 2008 with the aim of achieving no net loss (or a net gain) of biodiversity but has since been replaced by a 'Biodiversity Offsets Scheme' under the state Biodiversity Conservation Act 2016. BioBanking was run by the state government's Department of Environment and Climate Change as a voluntary market for biodiversity credits that could be applied as part of the planning process. Credits were created by landowners by establishing "biobanks" sites where they committed to conserving biodiversity. The credits represented improvement in biodiversity through conservation activities at the site and could be sold by the landowner for income and to fund the continued management of the biobank. The biodiversity credits under the system included ecosystem credits and species credits.

==== Native Vegetation Management in Victoria ====
In Victoria, the clearing of native vegetation is regulated under the Native Vegetation Management Framework. To regulate vegetation clearing, the BushBroker biodiversity banking scheme was set up in 2006 with the initial aim of net gain and later adoption of a no net loss aim.

=== Canada ===
Canada has a policy to offset loss of fish and fish habitat through habitat banking, under the Fisheries Act. According to the act, "no person shall carry on any work, undertaking or activity, other than fishing, that results in the death of fish" and "no person shall carry on any work, undertaking or activity that results in the harmful alteration, disruption or destruction of fish habitat". Policy states that other aquatic species at risk should also be considered when conducting habitat banking.

Habitat banking is a tool used to offset negative impacts of potential projects or development activities on fish (or their habitats), in advance of impact occurrence, by restoring, enhancing, or creating fish habitat by completing conservation projects. The positive impacts of these conservation projects on fish are quantified through habitat credits. Habitat credits can then be withdrawn from the habitat bank to offset negative impacts on fish or their habitats, but only by the creator of the habitat bank to offset their own impacts - the credits cannot be sold or traded to third parties. In addition, projects must adhere to the mitigation hierarchy, described as the hierarchy of measures, to be eligible to use habitat credits.

In Canada, habitat banking was first used in 1993 in North Fraser Harbour in Vancouver. Creation, restoration, and enhancement of habitat continues at Port Fraser - with creation, restoration, and enhancement of 15 hectares of fish and wildlife habitat since 2012, according to the Port Authority, to offset the effects of port development. Across Canada, the majority of offset projects are aquatic, including 43% in wetlands, 33% in streams, and 22% in rivers.

Further research is needed to determine a clear picture of the success of habitat banking in achieving no net loss of biodiversity and ecosystem functions in Canada. A 2006 analysis found that 25% of habitat banking projects achieved no net loss of habitat productivity, while 12% achieved a net gain. Compliance with monitoring requirements was also found to be low - it was difficult to determine the effectiveness of projects in achieving no net loss.

As well as habitat banking to conserve fish, other related schemes, such biodiversity credit schemes, have been started in Canada. For example, in 2019, Ontario-based regional conservation biology charity, Carolinian Canada Coalition launched a pilot model for the Conservation Impact Bond, a financial tool which pays for actions to increase biodiversity.

=== Colombia ===
Biodiversity banking has been implemented in Colombia since 2017, when the first habitat banks were registered there. Habitat banking is allowed as a mechanism for biodiversity offsetting through the purchase of biodiversity credits from habitat banks. The sale of these credits is used to fund conservation and restoration activities at the habitat bank for at least 30 years.

The first habitat bank to be established in Colombia was the El Meta Habitat Bank. The bank had been issued 600 biodiversity credits, all of which have since been sold. By August 2023, 14 habitat banks had been registered in the country, according to Cambio, a Colombia-based magazine.

The Ministry of Environment and Sustainable Development released habitat banking regulations in June 2017 under Resolution No. 1051. These were updated in 2018 with Resolution No. 256, requiring the use of a mitigation hierarchy (a sequence of measures meant to be applied in order to compensate for adverse impacts on the environment) to direct the use of habitat banking and other environmental mitigation measures.

It is thought that habitat banks could be used as a way to fund achievement of conservation goals (such as the National Biodiversity Strategy) while providing income and jobs for land owners and local communities.

=== United Kingdom ===
Habitat banking is being developed in England, as part of a Biodiversity Net Gain policy implemented in February 2024. The BNG policy requires a 10% net gain in biodiversity levels at a development site, measured using a 'Statutory Biodiversity Metric'. Habitat banks are suggested by Natural England as an off-site method for delivering biodiversity gains in advance of losses by creating and enhancing habitat, both on public or private lands. Credits generated from habitat restoration at these banks can then be purchased by developers as a way to achieve a 10% gain, if it is not possible to do on the site.

According to the Department for Environment, Food, and Rural Affairs, the land for a habitat bank must be secured using a conservation covenant or planning obligation, which acts as a legal commitment to managing the habitat for at least 30 years. A management and monitoring plan is then agreed between the landowner and a regulatory body, before the land can be added to a public register of biodiversity gain sites and sell credits to developers.

In England, habitat banks can be created by private or public landowners. For example, Berkshire, Buckinghamshire & Oxfordshire Wildlife Trust has created habitat banks. According to Devon County Council, one of the first registered habitat bank in England was established in the county at Duryard Valley Park near Exeter in March 2024. Other examples include habitat banks in Heacham and Doncaster.

== Challenges ==
There are deep uncertainties in measurement, credit issuance, and inherent risks in commodifying nature.

== See also ==
- Biodiversity – Variety and variability of life forms
- No net loss environmental policy
- Mitigation banking – Market-based system to compensate for environmental impacts to wetlands
- Conservation in Australia – Protection of biodiversity in Australia
- Environmental issues in Australia
- Economics of biodiversity – Economic importance of biodiversity
- Ecosystem services – Benefits provided by intact ecosystems
- Satoyama – Japanese term for the area between flat coastal plains and interior mountain foothills
- Biodiversity offsetting – System to mitigate negative development impacts
