= Biodiversity Impact Credit =

Biodiversity metric designed for commercial use

A Biodiversity Impact Credit (BIC) is a transferable biodiversity credit designed to reduce global species extinction risk. The underlying BIC metric, developed by academics working at Queen Mary University of London and Bar-Ilan University, is given by a simple formula that quantifies the positive and negative effects that interventions in nature have on the mean long-term survival probability of species. In particular, an organisation's global footprint in terms of BICs can be computed from PDF-based biodiversity footprints. The metric is broadly applicable across taxa (taxonomic groups) and ecosystems. Organisations whose overall biodiversity impact is positive in terms of the BIC metric contribute to achieving the objective of the Global Biodiversity Framework to "significantly reduce extinction risk".

Use of BICs by businesses has been recommended by the Task Force on Nature-related Financial Disclosures and the first provider of BICs for sale is Botanic Gardens Conservation International (BGCI). The credits are generated by BGCI's international member organisations by rebuilding the populations of tree species at high risk of extinction under the IUCN Red List methodology.

== Theory ==
=== Definition ===
Users of BICs distinguish between the metric's scientific definition and how metric values are estimated through methodologies and approximations suitable for particular contexts. This mirrors the situation with carbon credits, which are designed to quantify avoidance or reductions of atmospheric carbon dioxide load but in practice are estimated using a broad variety of context-specific methodologies.

For a given taxonomic or functional group of $S$ species, let $N_i$ be a measure of the current global population size of the $i$th species. This can be measured, e.g., by the number of mature individuals or population biomass, in some cases even by the number of colonies, whichever approximates total reproductive value well. Denote by $\Delta N_i$ the change in the global population of species $i$ resulting from a specific intervention in nature. The corresponding Biodiversity Impact Credits are then given by
$$\text{BIC}=\sum_i^S \frac{\Delta N_{i}}{N_i^*+N_i},$$
where $N^*_i$ denotes the population size of species $i$ at which environmental and demographic stochasticity are of the same magnitude.

=== Calculation ===
Depending on the kind of intervention, the system affected and the available data, a variety of methods is available to estimate BICs. Since typical values of $N^*_i$ lie in the range of 1 to 100 adult individuals, the contribution of $N^*_i$ in the definition above is often negligibly small compared to $N_i$. The formula then simplifies to
$$\text{BIC}=\sum_i^S \frac{\Delta N_{i}}{N_i}.$$
In projects that aim to rebuild the population of a single endangered species $i$, the term associated with that species will often dominate the sum in the formula above so that it simplifies further to
$$\text{BIC}=\frac{\Delta N_{i}}{N_i}.$$

When a species restoration project has increased the population of a species by an amount that is much larger than the original population (and $N^*_i$) and no comparable increases in the population of that species have occurred elsewhere, then the species' current population $N_i$ is nearly identical to the increase $\Delta N_{i}$ of the population achieved. In this case, the formula above simplifies to
$$\text{BIC}=1.$$

For use over large areas, approximations expressing BICs in terms of Range Size Rarity, Potentially Disappearing Fraction (PDF) of species, or combinations thereof are available. In particular, an organisation's global footprint in terms of BICs can be computed from PDF-based biodiversity footprints.

=== Interpretation ===
As a simple interpretation, the BIC metric measures the equivalent number of endangered species whose populations have been restored or (for negative BIC) the number of species that should be restored to achieve net zero biodiversity impact. This follows from above approximation that BIC = 1 for the restoration of a single threatened species.

However, the BIC metric goes beyond simply counting the number of threatened species that have been restored. It takes into account that decline or recovery of a species can be the result of many small impacts by different actors and attributes both positive and negative credits accordingly. Specifically, it is constructed such that, according to a simple model, BIC > 0 implies that the underlying intervention or combination of interventions leads to a reduction of mean long-term global species extinction risk for the taxonomic or functional group considered. According to the same model, a perfect market for BICs would lead to near-optimal allocation of resources to long-term species conservation.

=== Compatibility with other standards ===
The BIC metric aligns with other globally-recognised biodiversity measures such as the Range Size Rarity, the Species Threat Abatement and Recovery Metric (START) by IUCN/TNFD, and the Ecosystem Damage Metric underlying the Biodiversity Footprint for Financial Institutions (BFFI).

== Biodiversity Impact Credits in practice ==
=== Rationale ===
The search for standardised systems to quantify biodiversity impacts has gained momentum in light of the accelerating rates of biodiversity loss worldwide. Traditional biodiversity conservation efforts can lack scalability and are hard to measure: Improving one area of land or river has a different impact on local biodiversity from improving another, so their impacts are difficult to compare. BICs were developed with the aim to simplify assessments of biodiversity change by focusing on reducing species' extinction risks. The 2022 United Nations Biodiversity Conference emphasised the importance of global collaboration to halt biodiversity loss, marking the adoption of the Kunming-Montreal Global Biodiversity Framework (GBF). BICs are designed to address Target 4 of this framework ("to halt extinction of known threatened species ... and significantly reduce extinction risk" and Target 15: "[Take measures] to ensure that large transnational companies and financial institutions [...] transparently disclose their risks, dependencies and impacts on biodiversity ... in order to progressively reduce negative impacts."

The Task Force on Nature-related Financial Disclosures via their LEAP methodology recommends use of BICs to quantify impacts on species extinction risk in version 1.1 of their disclosure recommendations. The BIC methodology was one of four recognised metrics for assessing extinction risk.

Trees are at the base of the ecological pyramid. Countless species rely on native trees for survival, including fungi, lichen, insects, birds and other vertebrates. Repopulating native tree species improves local biodiversity, helps prevents soil erosion, conserves water and helps cools the planet as well as being a carbon store.

BGCI developed the GlobalTreeSearch database which is the only comprehensive, geo-referenced list of all the world's c.60,000 tree species. Working with the International Union for Conservation of Nature (IUCN) they then produced the Global Tree Assessment which concluded that more than 17,500 tree species (c.30%) are threatened with extinction. Finally, BGCI's Global Tree Conservation Program is the only global programme dedicated to saving the world's threatened tree species. Even before BICs were are launched, over 400 rare and threatened tree species had already been conserved in over 50 countries.

=== Implementation ===
One of the critical components of the BIC system is that it is being driven by conservation organisations like BGCI and their international network of members, and backed by theoretical analyses by several Queen Mary University London academics. These organisations provide the practical know-how and decades of experience in species conservation, focusing particularly on native trees which play a pivotal role in local ecosystems. BGCI is now mediating issuance of transferable BIC certificates to organisations who sponsor tree conservation projects by BGCI member organisations. The BIC system has been designed for easy adoption and scalability. This is crucial for engaging financial institutions and other large corporations that require streamlined, global, comparable, and straightforward metrics to set their sustainability goals. BGCI unveiled their Global Biodiversity Standard at the 2021 United Nations Climate Change Conference – a global biodiversity accreditation framework. BICs are due to be formally launched in early 2024.

== Critique ==
Biodiversity credits have been criticised by some who say that putting a monetary value on nature can oversimplify its ecological complexity and intrinsic value, making quantification unreliable or inappropriate. Concerns also remain that credits might be used simply to offset damage to nature, rather than to support proactive conservation efforts

Biodiversity credits have also been criticised as a way for companies to make false sustainability claims, a practice called greenwashing.

Nonetheless, proponents highlight significant potential benefits:

- Private investment in nature-based solutions has surged to approximately US $102 billion by mid‑2024, with voluntary biodiversity markets estimated to grow to US $1–2 billion by 2030 (and potentially US $69 billion by 2050)
- Emerging hybrid mechanisms—such as debt-for-nature swaps and integrated carbon–biodiversity credit frameworks—can channel finance toward verifiable conservation outcomes
- The voluntary market is gaining ground: since 2022, around US $325,000–1.9 million in credits have been transacted globally
- The Biodiversity Credit Alliance defines such credits as quantifiable, additional gains, e.g., a 1 percent biodiversity increase per hectare over one year. Pilot schemes—such as New Zealand’s early-stage voluntary market expansion announced in June 2025—are testing the model

However, deep challenges remain, including a US $700 billion/year global funding gap, technical complexity in measurement, and governance risks identified in 2025 policy briefs. Ensuring integrity, transparency and robust regulation will be critical to realising the promise of biodiversity credits.

== See also ==
- Biodiversity offsetting
- Biodiversity banking
