= Mutual property clauses =

Mutual property clauses are created to mitigate any risk of discrepancy regarding the usage of technologies or patents that was developed jointly in partnership by stating that it will become a mutual property with both partners have the right of the veto as to how the technology can be used or to whom it can be offered unless otherwise stated.

Any distribution or publishing of a mutual project that was developed jointly of one of the ex-partner without a written consent may result in direct violation and breach of agreement.
