= Native Vegetation Management Framework =

The Native Vegetation Management: A Framework for action 2002 is a Victorian strategy which aims to protect, enhance and revegetate Victoria's native vegetation. The Framework's main goal is to "achieve a reversal, across the entire landscape of the long-term decline in the extent and quality of native vegetation, leading to a net gain." . The framework is notable for the inclusion of offsets, which allow authorised land clearing, providing there is a net gain in biodiversity, and for the fact that a monetary value is being placed on biodiversity. The "habitat hectare" has been defined as the trading currency of the framework, and provides a reliable and repeatable measurement of the quality of the native vegetation when correctly administered by an experienced assessor. The trading in "habitat hectares" is a form of biodiversity banking, which occurs in the private market responding to the supply and demand of the available remnant vegetation.

The act is administered by the Victorian Department of Sustainability and Environment (DSE).

== See also ==
- Conservation in Australia
- Environmental issues in Australia
- Economics of biodiversity
