= Mitigation =

Reduction of something harmful or the reduction of its harmful effects

Mitigation is the reduction of something harmful that has occurred or the reduction of its harmful effects. It may refer to measures taken to reduce the harmful effects of hazards that remain in potentia, or to manage harmful incidents that have already occurred. It is a stage or component of emergency management and of risk management. The theory of mitigation is a frequently used element in criminal law and is often used by a judge to try cases such as murder, where a perpetrator is subject to varying degrees of responsibility as a result of one's actions.

== Disaster mitigation ==
An all-hazards approach to disaster management considers all known hazards and their natural and anthropogenic potential risks and impacts, with the intention of ensuring that measures taken to mitigate one type of risk do not increase vulnerability to other types of risks. Proactive disaster mitigation (also hazard mitigation) measures are generally more effective than reactive measures in eliminating or reducing the impacts, but not all disasters are reasonably foreseeable, and when an unforeseen disaster occurs, mitigation is necessarily after the fact. Proactive disaster mitigation measures may be structural or non-structural, and will generally be based on measurement and assessment of the risk and the cost of setting up the measures, and possibly the cost of maintenance. Mitigation planning identifies policies and actions that can be taken over the long term to reduce risk, and in the event of a disaster occurring, minimize loss. Such policies and actions are based on a risk assessment, using the identified hazards, vulnerabilities and probabilities of occurrence and estimates of impact to calculate risks, and are generally planned in cooperation with the stakeholder groups. The principles are applicable to mitigation of risk in general.

Planning processes may include:

- Stakeholder agreement on actions for risk reduction
- Assessment of relative risk and vulnerability
- Building partnerships among stakeholders
- Increasing awareness of hazards, vulnerabilities and risk
- Establishing priorities
- Aligning risk reduction and mitigation strategies with other objectives

Risk assessment and mitigation measures may include:

- Hazard mapping
- Flood plain mapping
- Land use and zoning practices
- Implementing and enforcing appropriate building codes
  - Reinforced tornado safe rooms
  - Burying of electrical cables to prevent ice build-up
  - Raising of buildings in flood-prone areas
- Public awareness programs
- Insurance programs

== Areas ==
=== Environment ===
- Climate change mitigation – Actions to reduce net greenhouse gas emissions to limit climate change
- Environmental mitigation – Measures to avoid, minimise, or compensate for adverse impacts on the environment in public administration; also, in particular:
  - Mitigation banking – Market-based system to compensate for environmental impacts to wetlands
- Hazard mitigation in emergency management; also, in particular:
  - Flood mitigation – Methods for reducing detrimental effects of flood waters
  - Landslide mitigation – Modifications to slopes to reduce the effect of landslides
  - Hurricane mitigation – Planning and actions to deal with a tropical cyclone strike
- Radon mitigation – Reducing radon gas levels in buildings

=== Financial risk ===
- Financial risk management deals with mitigation of financial risks

=== Information technology ===
- Mitigation, a kind of defense against security issues in computing, as part of vulnerability management and risk management.

=== Law ===
- Disaster Mitigation Act of 2000, a U.S. federal legislation passed in 2000 that amended provisions of the United States Code related to disaster relief
- Mitigation (law), the principle that a party who has suffered loss has to take reasonable action to minimize the amount of the loss suffered
- Also in law, mitigating factors may cause a crime to be considered less serious, or provide a reason to make a punishment less severe.

=== Occupational safety and health ===
Mitigation of the effects of incidents and health hazards is one of the central precepts of occupational safety and health, as workers may be exposed to hazards, and that it is not always possible to eliminate the associated risk, making it necessary to deal with the consequences on those occasions when harmful incidents occur.

=== Politics ===
- Mitigation of political risk

== See also ==
- Harm reduction
- Hazard – Situation or object that can cause harm
- Hazard analysis – Method for assessing risk
- Risk – Possibility of something bad happening
- Risk assessment – Estimation of risk associated with exposure to a given set of hazards
- Risk management – Identification, evaluation and control of risks
- Federal Emergency Management Agency (FEMA) – United States disaster response agency
- Risk Evaluation and Mitigation Strategies
- Disaster risk reduction
