= Environmental mitigation =

Measures to avoid, minimise, or compensate for adverse impacts on the environment

Environmental mitigation refers to the process by which measures to avoid, minimise, or compensate for adverse impacts on the environment are applied. In the context of planning processes like Environmental Impact Assessments, this process is often guided by applying conceptual frameworks like the "mitigation hierarchy" or "mitigation sequence". This generally includes the steps avoid, reduce, restore, and offset. In some countries, environmental mitigation measures, including biodiversity offsetting, may be required by law.

In practice, environmental mitigation measures might be implemented by establishing new habitat, restoring degraded habitat, and preserving or enhancing existing habitats to offset impacts that cannot be avoided or reduced. It is also often applied with certain objectives for biodiversity levels or specific ecosystems in mind, such as "no net loss" or "net gain".

== Terminology ==
Environmental mitigation can be defined in various ways depending on the institutions and countries where the term is applied, or on the framework that is used to guide mitigation. For example, it may be defined as the process by which measures to avoid, minimise, or compensate for adverse impacts on the environment are applied.

According to the Business and Biodiversity Offsets Programme, mitigation is defined as "measures to reduce impacts to the point where they have no adverse effects", including avoidance, minimisation, restoration, offsetting and compensation.

The term mitigation is used synonymously with biodiversity offsetting in some countries. For example, in the US, what is referred to as "biodiversity offsetting" in Australia, the UK, and South Africa comes under the term compensatory mitigation. Biodiversity offsets are classified as a type of mitigation measure and are defined in the United Nations' biodiversity glossary as "measurable conservation outcomes resulting from actions designed to compensate for significant residual adverse biodiversity impacts arising from project development after appropriate prevention and mitigation measures have been taken."

Climate change mitigation focuses specifically on actions to limit climate change by reducing net greenhouse gas emissions, while the scope of environmental mitigation is broader.

== Background ==
Living Planet Index from 1970, showing decline in species population

Biodiversity loss is occurring on a global scale and humans are driving this through changes in land use, exploitation of organisms, climate change, pollution, and invasive species. According to WWF's Living Planet Report, these drivers are underpinned by rapid economic growth and human population growth over the past 50 years.

The need to address biodiversity loss and to reconcile this with economic development so that sustainability and conservation goals can be met has motivated the development of environmental mitigation measures, like biodiversity offsetting and mitigation banking. A growing awareness of this has led to the expansion of legal requirements for environmental mitigation globally - 191 of the United Nations member states have Environment Impact Assessment legislation and more than 108 countries now have policies for biodiversity offsetting, a form of environmental mitigation.

== Aims ==
Environmental mitigation is often applied with the aim of achieving a specific goal such as "no net loss" (NNL) or a "net positive impact" (NPI) by using frameworks like the mitigation hierarchy. Depending on requirement, aims might be applied on the level of a single development site or on the level of landscapes, regions, and whole countries.

- No net loss - an environmental policy that aims to neutralise the loss of biodiversity, relative to an appropriately determined reference scenario.
- Net positive impact - a goal for the outcomes of a development project where the aim is for the negative environmental impacts of the project to be outweighed by the positive impacts of environmental mitigation measures; the goal is for the level of biodiversity to be greater than it was before the project.

Working towards these aims using the mitigation hierarchy (see § Mitigation hierarchy below) as a tool to guide environmental mitigation measures like biodiversity offsetting has been put forward as a way of contributing to broader societal goals for biodiversity and conservation, such as the Global Biodiversity Framework or nature positive. This is debated and the role of aims like NNL and tools like biodiversity offsetting to achieve or undermine conservation goals is disputed.

== Mitigation hierarchy ==
The mitigation hierarchy is a tool that is commonly used to guide the application of environmental mitigation measures. It aims to manage risks by applying a sequence of steps. The steps of the mitigation hierarchy (and terms used to describe them) vary regionally and across fields. In Environmental Impact Assessments, to which it is commonly applied, the mitigation hierarchy generally includes the following steps:

- Avoid - measures taken to avoid creating impacts. This step is widely regarded as the most important.
- Minimise - measures to reduce impacts that cannot be avoided.
- Restore/rehabilitate - measures to restore or rehabilitate ecosystems that have been cleared or degraded, following a development project/activity that caused impacts that could not be avoided or minimised. Restoration involves assisting the recovery of an ecosystem that has been degraded, damaged or destroyed.
- Offset - measures to compensate for residual negative impacts that cannot be avoided, minimised, or restored/rehabilitated, generally with the aim of no net loss or net gain of biodiversity.

The importance of applying these steps in order to effectively achieve conservation goals or policy aims (such as no net loss and net gain) has been emphasised.

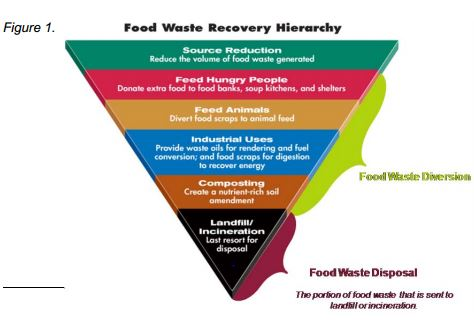
Application of the mitigation hierarchy as a tool to deal with food waste.

An increasing number of policies apply the principles of the mitigation hierarchy to environmental impact assessments that address the impacts of businesses and governments on the environment, including on biodiversity and ecosystem services. In this context, the mitigation hierarchy is usually applied with the goal of achieving no net loss. In some jurisdictions, the application of the mitigation hierarchy is required by law. Requirements for compliance with the mitigation hierarchy are often embedded within regulations to govern Environmental Impact Assessments and environmental licensing systems to evaluate and mitigate the environmental impacts of economic development.

Variations to the classical mitigation hierarchy have been proposed, like the Mitigation and Conservation Hierarchy and the Science Based Target Network's AR3T framework. In addition to its use for biodiversity, alternate versions of the mitigation hierarchy have been proposed for different sectors, such as waste, food waste, energy, and carbon.

== Environmental mitigation in the United States ==
The Fish and Wildlife Coordination Act in 1934 included the first legal expressions of the duty to minimise and compensate for negative environmental impacts. The act was a response to the impacts of rapid urban expansion and dam building in the US on salmon and other migratory fish. These efforts were later expanded on with the introduction of the National Environmental Policy Act of 1969 and with other regulations that require compensatory mitigation for some projects.

In the United States, compensatory mitigation is a commonly used form of environmental mitigation and, for some projects, it is legally required under the Clean Water Act 1972. Compensatory mitigation is defined by the US Department of Agriculture as "measures to restore, create, enhance, and preserve wetlands to offset unavoidable adverse impacts." Early wetland compensatory mitigation was regarded as a failure.

One of the main methods of compensatory mitigation in the US is mitigation banking, a market-based method to offset adverse impacts to wetlands (or streams and other bodies of water) that cannot be either avoided or reduced. This is done by selling credits from mitigation banks, which are sites where activities to preserve, enhance, create, or restore aquatic habitat are conducted and valued in the form of credits. Developers can purchase credits from mitigation banks to offset the "debit" of negative environmental impacts with the aim of achieving no net loss of wetlands. No net loss is the policy objective used to guide compensatory mitigation in the United States, but has since expanded to other countries, where no net loss of biodiversity may be required as the aim of environmental mitigation measures like biodiversity offsets.

Conservation banking is also used in the United States in the context of endangered species under the Endangered Species Act of 1973 as a form of compensatory mitigation.

== Biodiversity offsetting ==
Biodiversity offsetting is an environmental mitigation measure defined by the Business and Biodiversity Offsets Programme as "measurable conservation outcomes of actions designed to compensate for significant residual adverse biodiversity impacts arising from project development after appropriate prevention and mitigation measures have been taken." It is put forward as the final step of the mitigation hierarchy and regulations require that it is applied only after measures to avoid or reduce impacts.

It is an increasingly popular method of environmental mitigation for businesses and developers, though its suitability and success is debated. More than 100 countries worldwide have biodiversity offsetting requirements and, elsewhere, biodiversity offsetting may be applied as part of lending requirements from international financial institutions like the World Bank or as a voluntary commitment by businesses.

== Environmental crediting systems ==
Environmental mitigation might be conducted using an environmental crediting system (like a biodiversity banking framework) established by governing bodies that allocate debits and credits. Examples of such systems include biodiversity banking (a way to carry out biodiversity offsetting) and its various forms, including mitigation banking, habitat banking, species banking, or conservation banking, dependent on region or the goals of the system for conservation. This might be done with a specific objective, such as no net loss of wetlands for mitigation banking in the United States or no net loss of biodiversity for habitat banks in Colombia.

Credits are generated by banks where a natural resource has been deemed to be improved through conservation or preservation activities at the bank site. Debits arise where significant adverse environment impacts (such as degradation of a habitat or damage to a natural resource) are planned at a permitted site. Where a business or individual has a debit, they might be required to purchase a credit to offset an impact that cannot be otherwise avoided or reduced. For example, England's Biodiversity Net Gain policy requires that developers purchase biodiversity credits from the government if they are unable to achieve a 10% gain in biodiversity by creating or enhancing habitat on their development site. Some entities might also purchase credits form these systems voluntarily.

An example of an environmental crediting system is the mitigation banking system in the United States. This system tends to be used to compensate for impacts on wetlands and other aquatic habitats in advance of their occurrence. It is the preferred method for compensatory mitigation under guidelines set by the EPA (Environmental Protection Agency) and US Army Corps of Engineers - the agencies tasked with regulating mitigation banking in the United States. As part of this system, credits are purchased from mitigation banks by anyone who incurs a debit from impacts to wetlands and other aquatic habitats that cannot otherwise be avoided or reduced. Mitigation banks are sites where mitigation projects have been carried out, such as preservation, enhancement, restoration, or habitat creation.

Separate from biodiversity offsetting, nature credits might be purchased as a way for companies to achieve environmental commitments (such as commitments to work towards a nature positive economy) by helping to fund initiatives like the Kunming-Montreal Global Biodiversity Framework or national biodiversity strategies.

=== Issues ===
Determining the currency that a system will be based on and ensuring that debits and credits are ecologically equivalent are considered challenging issues for environmental crediting systems. There is no single agreed upon method for determining the value of credits to ensure that biodiversity lost and gained have an equivalent value. Ensuring that the outcomes of conservation projects used to generate credits are better for biodiversity than if the projects had not happened (a concept called additionality) is another challenge.

One reason for this is the complexity of assessing the value of biodiversity, such as in terms of ecosystem services, both across different habitats and over time in the same habitat. The principle of quantifying biodiversity value by using credit and debit units is debated, with some people considering it an impossible task or reject the idea for ethical reasons.

The use of credit ratios has been proposed as a method to address uncertainties. In the United States, regulators often assign 'mitigation ratios' in the case of compensatory mitigation agreements. The ratio is used to compare the acres of wetland impacted at a development site with the gains at the proposed mitigation bank to determine how many mitigation credits are needed to achieve no net loss or better. For example, coverage ratios of 3:1 would require 3 compensatory mitigation credits for each unit of "debit" caused by an ecological disturbance.

== See also ==
- Mitigation
- Mitigation banking
- Environmental Impact Assessment
- Biodiversity offsetting
- Biodiversity banking
- Biodiversity loss
- Climate change mitigation
- No net loss environmental policy
