= Conservation banking =

Conservation banking is an environmental market-based method designed to offset adverse effects, generally, to species of concern, are threatened, or endangered and protected under the United States Endangered Species Act (ESA) through the creation of conservation banks. Conservation banking can be viewed as a method of mitigation that allows permitting agencies to target various natural resources typically of value or concern, and it is generally contemplated as a protection technique to be implemented before the valued resource or species will need to be mitigated. The ESA prohibits the "taking" of fish and wildlife species which are officially listed as endangered or threatened in their populations. However, under section 7(a)(2) for Federal Agencies, and under section 10(a) for private parties, a take may be permissible for unavoidable impacts if there are conservation mitigation measures for the affected species or habitat. Purchasing “credits” through a conservation bank is one such mitigation measure to remedy the loss.

Conservation banks are permanently protected parcels of land with inherent abilities to harbor, preserve, and manage the survival of endangered and threatened species, along with their critical habitat. This allows the acquisition and protection of the parcels of land prior to future loss or disturbance to valued resources. Banks are often considered to be the more ecologically efficient option for mitigation because they generally incorporate larger tracts of land that enables higher quality habitat and range connectivity, thereby creating a stronger chance of survival and sustainability for the species. Rather than have developments offset their effects by conserving small areas of habitat, conservation banking allows pooling multiple mitigation resources into a larger reserve. The intention of conservation banking is to create a no-net loss of the intended resources. Conservation banking may be used by various entitles as a method of species and habitat protection, as long as it is approved by the permitting agency.

== Background ==
=== Mitigation ===
Mitigation is the preservation of natural resources in order to offset unavoidable impacts to similar resources. Conservation banking mitigation is specific to species and their habitat which are protected under the Endangered Species Act. There are two other forms of mitigation besides conservation banking, including in-lieu fee and permittee-responsible programs. In-Lieu fee programs allows a permittee to contribute money into a United States Fish and Wildlife Service (USFWS) approved fund in lieu of implementing their own mitigation. To date, In-Lieu fee programs have only applied to wetlands. The sponsor of the fund then implements an appropriate mitigation project when enough money has been collected through the fund. In these situations, the fund sponsor is fully liable for the success of the mitigation. The second alternative form of mitigation is the Permittee-Responsible program, which allows the permittee takes on implementation and assumes liability for their own mitigation project to offset effects.

=== Benefits ===
There is generally greater security associated with a conservation bank. This is due to the stringent performance standards imposed on bank owners by the USFWS, which also requires them to have adequate funding into perpetuity, and to have long term management plans. Purchasing of credits by the easement holder from the landowner creates a legal contract, known as a conservation easement. The conservation easement binds the landowner to uphold the requirements of the conservation bank. Another advantage is that purchasing credits from a conservation bank ensures that species and/or habitat protection is already in place before the impact occurs. In addition, liability for habitat and species mitigation success is shifted to the conservation bank owner is a benefit to the developer or permittee.

== History ==
Conservation banking is derived from wetland mitigation banks that were created in the early 1990s. Through Federal agency efforts, mitigation banks were created to focus on preserving wetlands, streams, and other aquatic habitats or resources and offered compensatory mitigation credits to offset unavoidable effects on the habitats or resources under Section 404 of the Clean Water Act. After the “Federal Guidance for the Establishment, Use, and Operation of Mitigation Banks (60 FR 5860558614)” was published in 1995, California contemporaneously led efforts to create conservation banks as to further increase regional conservation due to growing development threatening species and their habitat. Approval of conservation banks for various federally-listed species by the USFWS, in conjunction with other Federal agencies, began throughout the early 1990s. Collectively, the nation’s 130 conservation banks is equivalent to over 160,000 acres of permanently protected land.

=== Endangered Species Act Connection ===
Under the Endangered Species Act of 1973, endangered or threatened species and their respective critical habitat and geographical range are protected for conservation with efforts made to restore the species and habitat back to well-being. Under ESA Section 10(b), takings are permitted only if the taking is incidental and otherwise lawful activity but requires that effects be minimized and mitigated to the maximum extent practicable. For projects and development that will damage an at-risk species’ habitat, such as reducing, modifying, or degrading its habitat, its permittees are required to mitigate the impact. Conservation banks act as a mechanism for compensation when a species or habitat is affected during development by providing credits that can be purchased by permitees to offset their negative impact.

== Function ==
Conservation banking is a market program that increases the bank owner or landowner's stewardship and incentive for permanently protecting their land by providing them a set number of habitat or species credits that the respective owners are able to sell. In order to satisfy the requirements of a species or habitat conservation measures, these conservation credits can be sold to projects or developments that result in unavoidable and adverse impacts to species. Essentially, conservation banks offsite the cost to mitigate the loss or damage to a species and/or their habitat.

Traditionally, preservation of some habitat area of an at-risk species were required by a project permitee during development. This could result in habitat that became isolated, small, with reduced connectivity or functionality, and was more costly to maintain. Comparatively, conservation banks are more cost effective as they are able to maintain larger blocks of land with greater functionality for a species, such as allowing habitat connectivity. For purchasers, this is also time-effective by allowing them to forgo their responsibility of handling on-or-off mitigation measures that can run into administrative delays due to the USFWS review and approval process. After the public or private party purchases credits, a bank transfer occurs between the project party and banker. The banker is then perpetually bound to conserve and manage the conservation bank.

== Creation Process ==
In California, a multi-agency process oversees the review and approval of conservation banks by the Inter-agency Review Team, which can be composed of all or some of the following agencies; typically the U.S. Fish and Wildlife Service, National Oceanic and Atmospheric Administration's National Marine Fisheries Service, and the California Department of Fish and Wildlife. After review and approval, the Inter-agency Review Team and conservation bank sponsor signs a legally-binding conservation bank enabling instrument, which details the responsibilities of each party and includes a management plan, endowment funding agreement, and other documents detailing the operations of the conservation bank.

Unless the lands have been previously listed or designated for other conservation purposes, Private, Tribal, State, and local government lands are all considered eligible to be conservation banks. Agricultural lands, such as used for farming, ranching, timber operations, croplands or related, may be suitable for the establishment of a conservation bank if the special-status species habitat on-site is intact or restored; however, agricultural and forestry activities may need to be modified, reduced, or stopped entirely if necessary to protect the conservation values of the land.

=== Management Plan ===
Establishment of a bank requires a management plan that outlines necessary management activities and endowment funds. The intention of the plan is to describe the long-term management activities of the conservation bank. The plan describes restricted and allowed activities and provides guidance on all monitoring and reporting requirements. The minimal requirements of a management plan includes:

1. A full geophysical description of the site, including the area, geographical setting, neighboring land uses, and any relevant cultural or historic features located in the site.
2. Identifies the biological resources within the bank, such as a vegetation map.
3. Describes restricted and permitted activities that can occur on-site
4. The objectives and biological goals of the conservation bank is described.
5. All management activities are fully described for the conservation bank in order to meet the objectives and biological goals, such as necessary ecological restoration of its habitats, incorporation of public use and access, and budgeting requirements.
6. Necessary monitoring schedules, including special management plan activities.
7. If necessary, outlines how future management will occur, such as decision trees or similar.

Creation of the bank must also include plans for remedial action in case bank owners are unable to fulfill their agreements. Remedial actions can include forfeiting the property to a third party to uphold the requirements of the bank or posting a bond valued equivalent to the property. Typically acts of nature, including earthquakes, floods, or fires, are excluded from liability of the bank owner.

== Credits ==
Credits are essentially the currency of the conservation value associated with the habitat and/or species which may be affected by development. It is the ecological value of a species or habitat. The permitting agency is responsible for determining the credits available at any given bank, based on the number of species and the habitat characteristic for those species, on the land owned by the bank. They then allocate the appropriate number of credits to the bank owner, who can then establish the price through negotiation with agencies. Pricing of conservation credits are variable based on the type of species impacted through a developmental take. Additionally, the market forces of supply and demand largely dictate the price of any given credit, and the value may fluctuate based on many other economic factors such as land value, competition, and speculation about development in a certain habitat area. Current data suggests that conservation credits range in price from a low of $1500 per mitigation of a Gopher Tortoise to as much as $325,000 for vernal pool preservation.

== Locations currently used ==
There are currently fourteen states and Saipan, the largest of the Northern Mariana Islands, with approved USFWS conservation banks. These states include Arizona, California, Colorado, Florida, Kansas, Maryland, Mississippi, Oklahoma, Oregon, South Carolina, Texas, Utah, Washington, and Wyoming.

Nationally, some species with the largest respective habitat coverage include: American burying beetle, California tiger salamander, California red-legged frog, calippe silverspot butterfly, Florida panther, golden-cheeked warbler, lesser prairie chicken, Utah prairie dog, valley elderberry longhorn beetle, vernal pool fairy shrimp, vernal pool tadpole shrimp.

In 1995, California was the first state to create a conservation bank and continues to be the national leader in number of conservation banks, with over 30 established banks. Species benefited in these banks include the burrowing owl, coastal sage scrub, delta smelt, California giant garter snake, longfin smelt, California salmonids, San Bernardino kangaroo rat, San Joaquin kit fox, Santa Ana River Woollystar, Swainson's Hawk, and valley elderberry longhorn beetle. Examples of Californian habitats include ephemeral drainages, riparian zones, vernal pools, and wetlands.

== Future outlook ==
Two pieces of recent legislation were created, which will likely affect the future of conservation banking. A draft of the Endangered Species Act Compensatory Mitigation Policy was proposed by the Department of Fish and Wildlife Service in September, 2016 with the intention to create a mechanism for the US Department of the Interior to comply with Executive order (80 FR 68743), which directs Federal agencies that manage natural resources “to avoid and then minimize harmful effects to land, water, wildlife, and other ecological resources (natural resources) caused by land- or -water-disturbing activities…” This policy would provide guidance to the USFWS about planning and implementation of compensatory mitigation strategies. If adopted, the policy would require a shift from project-by-project compensatory mitigation approaches to broader, landscape oriented approaches such as conservation banking.

In addition, the California legislature passed Assembly Bill 2087, which will enable large conservation goals to be achieved through the creation of advance mitigation credits associated with FWS Regional Conservation Investment Strategies (RCIS). This is important for the future of conservation banking because the bill allows for consideration of mitigation for impacts to wildlife and habitat in conservation strategy planning and decision making.

== See also ==
- Endangered Species Act
- US Fish and Wildlife Service
- Mitigation banking
- Environmental mitigation
- Biodiversity banking
- Biodiversity offsetting
