= Wetlands of the United States =

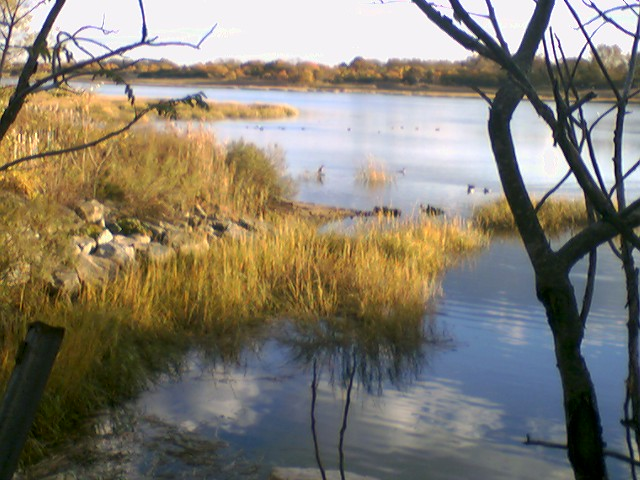
Among the Salt Marsh Nature Center, in Brooklyn, NY

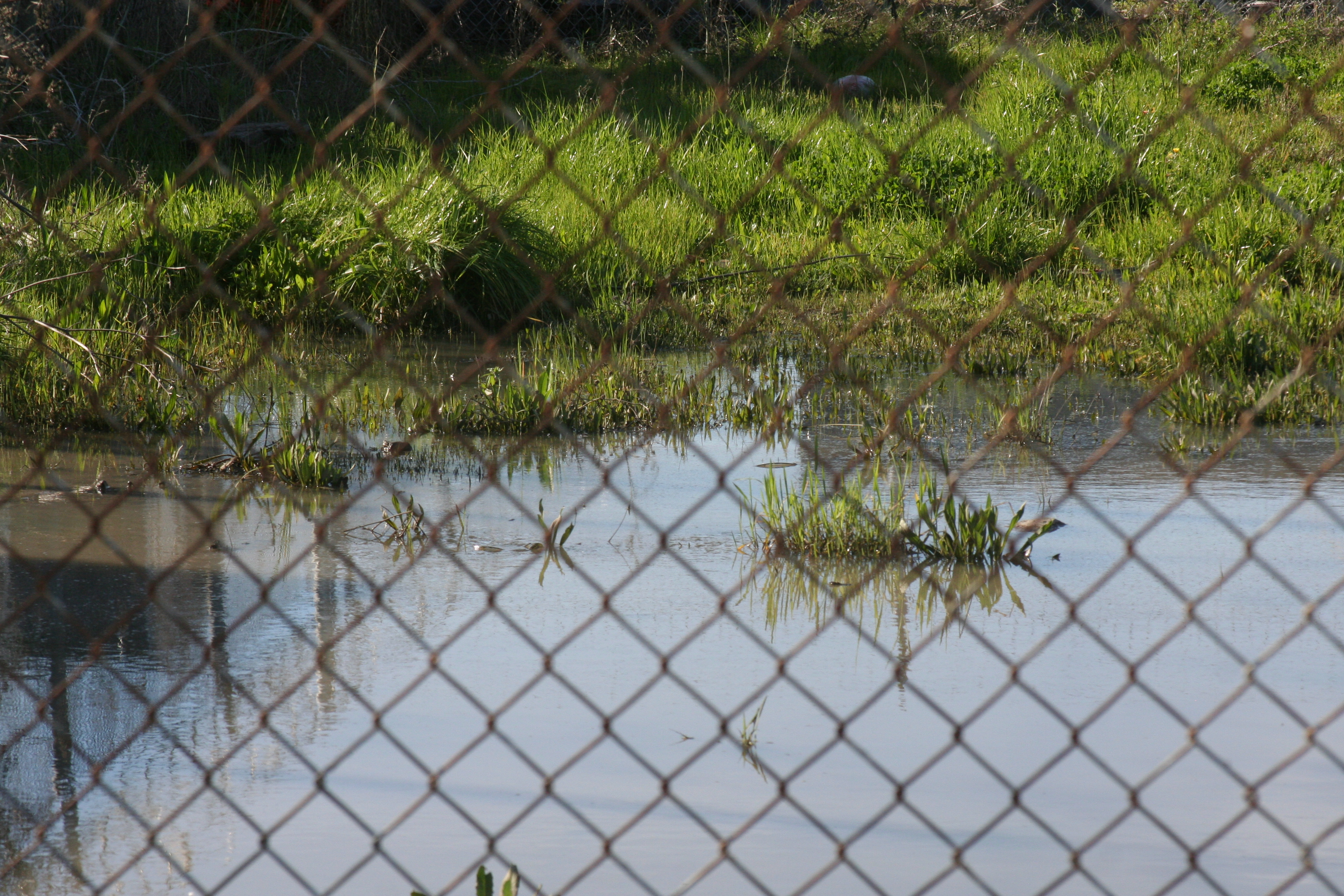
Wetlands protected by steel fence, San Francisco, CA

Wetlands of the United States are defined by the United States Army Corps of Engineers and the United States Environmental Protection Agency as "those areas that are inundated or saturated by surface or ground water at a frequency and duration sufficient to support, and that under normal circumstances do support, a prevalence of vegetations typically adapted for life in saturated soils. Wetlands generally include swamps, marshes, bogs, and similar areas." Wetlands can be valued in terms of their contributions to ecological, economic and social systems. Wetlands service these systems through multiple processes including water filtration, water storage and biological productivity. They also contribute the functions of flood control, providing a nutrient sink, groundwater recharge and habitat.

The United States is a signatory to the Ramsar Convention, an international treaty for the conservation and sustainable utilization of wetlands. Under the Swampbuster provisions of the Food Securities Act of 1985, farmers who modify existing wetlands may lose their benefits under the USDA farm program. Additionally, every Presidential administration since George H.W. Bush has operated under a "no net loss" of wetlands federal policy goal.

In the United States, some wetlands are regulated by the federal government under the Clean Water Act. Determining the boundary between regulated wetlands and non-regulated lands therefore can be contentious. In reality, there is no natural boundary between the classes that humans define on these gradients (wetland/upland), and this issue is highlighted by the U.S. Fish and Wildlife Service's definition from Classification of Wetlands and Deepwater Habitats of the United States, which defines wetlands as "lands transitional between terrestrial and aquatic systems." Regulations to protect water quality and highway safety require that we create arbitrary boundaries within those gradients, but these boundaries are scientifically definable, and consist of areas where three criterion of the presence of hydric soils, the presence of wetland vegetation, and the presence of appropriate hydrology.

Such regulations must be predictable, reproducible, and enforced otherwise there will be a sacrifice of clean water for development in the case of wetlands regulation (or vice versa), or sacrifice safe travel for quick travel (or vice versa) in the case of speed limits. Determining which wetlands are regulated under section 404 of the Clean Water Act or Section 10 of the Rivers and Harbors Act is termed "jurisdictional determination". Determining the boundary of wetland, whether jurisdictional under sections 404 or 10, or not jurisdictional but still meeting the technical definition of a wetland, that is having the soils, vegetation and hydrology criterion met is called a "wetland delineation", and generally is performed by college graduates with natural science or biology degrees working for engineering firms or environmental consulting firms who are familiar with the 1987 U.S. Army Corps of Engineers Wetland delineation manual.

Defining a boundary depends upon the ground and vegetation characteristics; it is easier to do where the slope of the land is steeper. Deciding if a wetland is a regulated wetland depends on classifying the water in it as "water of the United States" or not. Classifying water as "of the U.S." or "not of the U.S." for purposes of enforcing the Clean Water Act suggests a natural boundary that probably does not exist in nature, and one that was not created regarding air for purposes of enforcing the Clean Air Act. Indiana Wetlands are the focus of the U.S. National Wetlands Coalition, which in turn has become the focus of some controversy over "false fronts," a form of political camouflage.

== Wetlands loss in the United States ==
Since the 16th century, more than half of the estimated original 220,000,000+ acres of U.S. wetlands (not including Alaska) have been degraded or destroyed.

== National Wetlands Inventory ==
Major remaining wetlands of the United States. Red dots indicate critical wetlands.

The U.S. Fish and Wildlife Service's National Wetlands Inventory (NWI) produces and provides information on the characteristics, extent, and status of U.S. wetlands and deepwater habitats and other wildlife habitats. The NWI also produces periodic reports on the status and trends of wetlands in the conterminous U.S. The NWI website includes a Wetlands Mapper.

The Wetlands Geodatabase and the Wetlands Mapper, as an Internet discovery portal, provide technological tools that allow the integration of large relational databases with spatial information and map-like displays. The information is made available to an array of federal, state, tribal, and local governments and the public. The Service's wetlands data forms a layer of the National Spatial Data Infrastructure (NSDI) and is an important component of Department's geospatial line of business portfolio and actively supports the E-government initiative through the Geospatial One- Stop and The National Map.

== Geodatabase characteristics and status ==
The Service's Wetlands Geodatabase contains five units (map areas) that are populated with digital vector data and raster images. These units include the conterminous U.S., Alaska, Hawaii, Puerto Rico and the U.S. Virgin Islands, and the Pacific Trust Territories. Each unit of the geodatabase contains seamless digital map data in ArcSDE geodatabase format. Data are in a single standard projection (Albers Equal-Area Conic Projection), horizontal planar units in meters, horizontal planar datum is the North American Datum of 1983 (also called NAD83), and minimum coordinate precision of one centimeter. Links are available to supplemental wetland information and metadata records that are compliant with the Federal Geographic Data Committee (FGDC) Content Standards for Digital Geospatial Metadata, Version 2.0. The Wetlands Geodatabase also contains other proprietary Service datasets and developmental data, feature classes or information.

The Wetlands Geodatabase is one of the world's largest polygonal datasets (in the civilian sector). The information is increasingly popular and widely used to help identify, conserve, and restore wetland resources across the American landscape. During 2008, the number of website user requests for data exceeded 56.9 million. The Service continues to point large data users to the Web Map Service (WMS) capability. This option provides Federal and State agencies as well as large institutional users an opportunity to establish Open Geographic Consortium (OGC) linkages to ensure they are getting the latest and most complete digital data set. There were also 867 technical assistance requests in 2008.

== Geospatial data status - wetlands ==
In 2008, data covering 66,200,000 acres (268,000 km^{2}) were added to the Wetlands Geodatabase. These included 28,100,000 acres (114,000 km^{2}) of updated wetland map information, new data for 6,800,000 acres (28,000 km^{2}) not previously available and 31,300,000 acres (127,000 km^{2}) of data that were captured in digital format. An additional 8,245 hard copy maps (quadrangles) were added as raster image files.

Currently the Wetlands Geodatabase contains over 34,500 7.5 minute map areas in a seamless ArcSDE geodatabase format. This represents wetland map data for approximately 64 percent of the conterminous U.S., 30 percent of Alaska, 100 percent of the windward islands of Hawaii, 77 percent of Puerto Rico and the U.S. Virgin Islands and, 100 percent of Guam and Saipan in the Pacific Trust Territories. By the end of 2008, the Wetlands Geodatabase contained 67 gigabytes of data, including 14.9 million polygonal features. The current status of on-line wetlands data is shown in figure 1.

Web accessible geospatial wetlands data can be found at the U.S. Fish and Wildlife website. Additional web accessible Geodatabase documentation and information can be found in the Appendix on page 11.

The wetlands data layer is increasing in size each year primarily due to existing analog data being converted to vector or raster images. Contributed data from the U.S. Army Corps of Engineers Regulatory Database (ORM2), other federal, state and local organizations is also increasing. More and newer data will need to come from other sources in the future to achieve the goals of producing a complete data layer for the Nation and keeping it current.

== See also ==
- Mississippi River Gulf Outlet
- National Estuarine Research Reserve
- National Estuarine Research Reserve System
- National Wetlands Research Center
- North American Wetlands Conservation Act
- Wetlands of Louisiana
- Wetlands Reserve Program
- No net loss (wetlands)
