= Mitigation banking =

Market-based system to compensate for environmental impacts to wetlands

Mitigation banking is a market-based system of debits and credits (used primarily in the United States as part of its "no net loss" policy) that involves restoration, creation, or enhancement of wetlands to compensate for unavoidable impacts to a wetland in another location. It involves a system of mitigation banks, sites where projects to restore, create, or enhance wetlands can be carried out in advance of impacts. The outcomes of these projects are valued through the creation of compensatory mitigation credits that can be purchased from mitigation banks to offset the negative impacts of developments or agriculture expansion on wetlands and aquatic habitats. This process is generally conducted with the aim of achieving no net loss of function and value for specific aquatic habitats, such as in terms of the biodiversity or ecosystem services provided by a wetland.

Mitigation banking is a form of biodiversity banking, and a mechanism to conduct biodiversity offsetting (described by the term "compensatory mitigation" in the United States). Mitigation banking was developed in the United States with the aim of conserving wetlands (while still allowing development) by working towards a goal of "no net loss of wetlands", developing from compensatory mitigation policies under section 404 of the Clean Water Act. Since then, the concept has expanded beyond the United States and, from mitigation banking, various other forms of biodiversity banking evolved, including conservation banking and habitat banking.

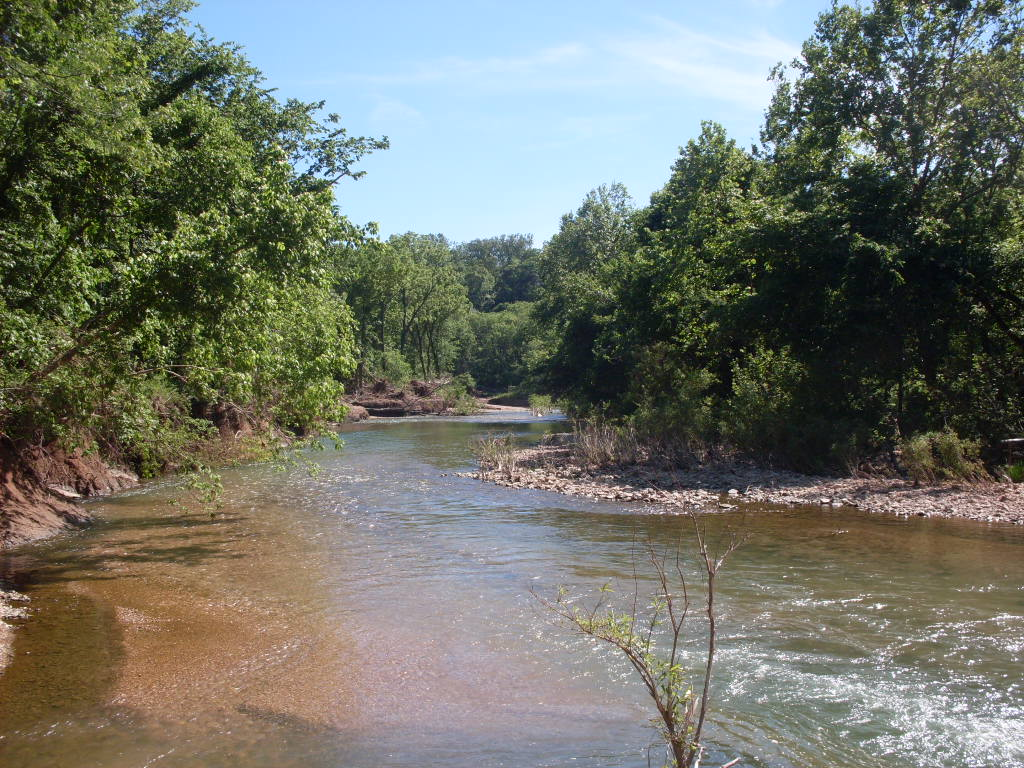
Fox Creek near St. Louis, Missouri, the site of the first stream mitigation bank in the United States approved by the US Army Corps of Engineers in 2000.

The public interest is served when enforcement agencies require more habitat as mitigation, often referred to as a mitigation ratio, than is adversely impacted by management or development of nearby acreage. Wetland Mitigation Credits do not convey any interest in the real estate that hosts the mitigation bank. Wetland Credits are treated, for accounting purposes, as intangible personal property.

== Terminology ==
Mitigation banking is defined by the Natural Resources Conservation Service (a US government agency) as "restoration, creation or enhancement of wetlands for the purpose of compensating for manipulated wetlands at another location".

This system uses mitigation banks - wetland areas that have been restored, established, enhanced, or preserved away from the site of impacts and set aside to compensate for future damage to wetlands. Banks can be created by bank sponsors (such as government agencies, corporations, non-profits) by making a formal agreement with the US Army Corps of Engineers that describes the plan for restoring the site and the number of credits it is expected to generate. The functions of the bank or the acres that have been restored within its "service area" (its geographical location) are quantified to determine the value of the credits sold by the bank.

Where a wetland is described as "manipulated", this might mean that it has been drained, dredged, filled, levelled, or altered in some other way to allow agriculture or development to take place on the site. If manipulation of wetlands results in unavoidable adverse impacts, compensatory mitigation measures are used to offset these impacts. Unavoidable adverse impacts are negative effects on wetlands that cannot reasonably be avoided or minimised, therefore requiring compensatory mitigation. The mitigation sequence is used as a tool to guide the type and level of compensatory mitigation that will be required under the Clean Water Act. It includes the steps avoid, minimise, and compensate, requiring that avoidance and minimisation measures should be exercised before compensation. The term mitigation hierarchy may also be used and its framework has been expanded.

Compensatory mitigation includes measures to restore, create, enhance, and preserve wetlands to offset unavoidable adverse impacts. It is a form of environmental mitigation and can include both on-site (on or adjacent to the site of impacts) and off-site mitigation. The measures that come under compensatory mitigation and conducted as part of mitigation banking are defined by the EPA as:

- Restoration involves re-establishing wetland conditions to an area where wetland used to exist.
- Enhancement involves alterations to increase function and value of existing wetland.
- Creation involves making a new wetland or aquatic resource where one did not exist beforehand.
- Preservation involves permanently protecting wetlands that are considered ecologically important. This can involve physical and legal methods, such as conservation easements or title transfers.

Mitigation banking is one of three main mechanisms used in the United States to carry out compensatory mitigation, in addition to in-lieu fee mitigation and permittee-responsible mitigation.

== Mitigation banking in the US ==
=== Policies ===
In the United States, federal agencies (under section 404 of the Clean Water Act (CWA)), as well as many state and local governments, require compensatory mitigation (described as biodiversity offsetting in other countries) for the disturbance or destruction of wetland, stream, or endangered species habitat.

Under the CWA, a permit is required for certain activities that impact wetlands and other aquatic habitats. To receive the permit, applicants might be required to compensate for the environmental impacts of their proposed activities, including by purchasing credits from a mitigation bank. Mitigation banking is administered and regulated by the US Environmental Protection Agency and the US Army Corps of Engineers (USACE).

The USEPA identifies four components of a mitigation bank: the bank site, the bank instrument, the Interagency Review Team (IRT), and the service area.

- The bank site identifies the acreage of the area preserved, enhanced, restored, or created under the mitigation bank.
- The bank instrument is the formal agreement between regulatory agencies and the bank sponsor which establishes liability, monitoring, and management of the mitigation bank. It also sets out how many compensatory mitigation credits a bank will sell. A public agency, non-profit organisation, or private entity (such as a landowner or a business) can act as a bank sponsor.
- The IRT regulates approval and oversight of the mitigation bank.
- The service area identifies the area in which the bank can compensate for permitted impacts by selling credits. Mitigation banks with multiple credit types (habitat types) can have different service areas for each credit type.

A policy of "no net loss" of habitat value and function has been used as the objective for mitigation banking in the United States since the 1990s. This means that where impacts are caused, they should be compensated for using environmental mitigation measures like mitigation banking so that there is no overall loss in the value or function of wetland habitats. There have been challenges to implementing and monitoring this policy. In some cases, wetland mitigation programs have been approved based on total area rather than in terms of equivalence of ecological function. In addition, where mitigation banks are located far from the site of impact, rather than in the same watershed as the impact, it may be difficult or impossible to retain original value and function.

=== Mitigation credits ===
Mitigation banks are valued in terms of "compensatory mitigation credits". The number of credits available for sale by a given mitigation bank is set out in the bank instrument and determined using an ecological assessment. These credits can then be purchased as a way for individuals or entities to compensate for negative impacts that cannot otherwise be avoided or minimised.

A mitigation bank generates credits for the amount and quality of habitat the bank site improves. Credits are units of exchange defined as the ecological value associated with converting a naturally occurring wetland or other specific habitat type, for economic purposes.

Mitigation credits to compensate for impacts to river banks (described as riparian impacts) may be assigned in relation to the linear distance of a stream functioning at the highest possible capacity within the watershed of the bank. Mitigation credits are determined based on bank acreage, functional units, and other assessments.

The estimated potential number of credits a bank may earn can vary based on ecological performance of the bank. The Interagency Review Team periodically releases bank credits as the bank meets certain performance milestones. This happens over the course of the "establishment period", which lasts around 10 to 12 years. When the IRT releases potential bank credits, they become available credits meaning they can be purchased for ecological offset.

Credits are designated by an interagency Mitigation Bank Review Team (MBRT). The MBRT evaluates and permits a proposed mitigation bank. They also determine the number of potential mitigation credits a bank may earn and sell. The MBRT may include representatives of various federal, state and/or local government agencies, including: U.S. Army Corps of Engineers, National Marine Fisheries Service, Environmental Protection Agency, US Fish and Wildlife Service, State Environmental Protection Divisions, Local Water Management Districts, County Environmental Departments and the Soil Conservation Service.

The RIBITS (Regulatory In lieu fee and Bank Information Tracking System) website was created by the USACE to provide information on mitigation and conservation banks and in-lieu fee (ILF) program sites. RIBITS contains local and national policies and procedures for mitigation banking. It houses information about all mitigation banks and ILF sites including site documents, mitigation credit availability, and service areas as well as tracks all credit transactions.

== Mitigation banking beyond the US ==
The mitigation banking concept has been extended to develop other forms of biodiversity banking that are applied outside of the United States as a mechanism for biodiversity offsetting. For example, mitigation banking has been used to inform and shape biodiversity banking frameworks in Australia, New Zealand, Canada, Colombia, and Brazil.

Biodiversity banking is an umbrella term that encompasses a range of market-based systems for offsetting, including mitigation banking, conservation banking, habitat banking, and species banking. Biodiversity banking describes a market-based framework for biodiversity offsetting where offsets can be traded in the form of credits to offset negative environmental impacts of development projects or activities.

== History ==
=== Origins ===
Compensatory mitigation was developed in the United States with the aim of balancing the demand for economic development with the need to conserve wetlands. This began with the Clean Water Act (CWA) in 1972. Under Section 404 of the CWA, a permit from the US Army Corps of Engineers is required to conduct certain activities that may impact wetlands. The developer must submit a Public Notice to their respective district of the US Army Corps of Engineers (USACE) requesting to carry out a project and associated ecological impacts on a wetland.

Mitigation banking was developed in the United States in the 1980s as a new method for compensatory mitigation with a market-oriented, off-site approach. Guidance from the US Fish and Wildlife Service in 1983 led to the establishment of the first wetland mitigation banks in the early 1980s. The practice began as a way for state highway and public works departments to comply with regulations for wetland mitigation, and later entrepreneurial banks were set up to sell credits to public and private developers. For example, the Fina La Terre in Louisiana, signed off in 1984 and proposed by a private company, was one of the first mitigation banks in the country.

The Corps initially preferred on-site mitigation to preserve the wetland functions at their location. Unfortunately, this approach had a low long-term success rate. A 1993 Memorandum of Agreement gave national guidance on mitigation banking by instead supporting a market-oriented method. It supported off-site wetland mitigation in which a permittee purchases mitigation credits from a third-party mitigation bank. This entity, private, governmental, or non-governmental, promotes the no-net-loss policy by restoring or creating an area of wetland into a mitigation bank and selling compensatory mitigation credits to permittees.

=== Development since the 1990s ===
In 1995, federal guidance governing the establishment, use and operation of mitigation banks was issued by several government agencies, including USACE, EPA, NRCS, USFWS, and NOAA (National Oceanic and Atmospheric Administration) Fisheries. This guidance defined mitigation banks and their objectives, enabling the use of mitigation banking for compensatory mitigation to meet the goal of "no net loss" of wetlands.

The application of mitigation banking has been expanded beyond wetlands to include streams and other aquatic habitats. This led to the creation of the first stream mitigation bank in Fox Creek, Missouri in 2000. The concept has also been expanded to develop other forms of biodiversity banking, including conservation banking for endangered species in California and habitat banking in other countries. By 2000, there were over 230 private mitigation banks and 180 state-run mitigation banks. By 2001, 23 states had statutes or regulations authorising the use of mitigation banks and a further 8 had issued guidelines to govern mitigation banking.

In 2008, the regulations for compensatory mitigation (which includes mitigation banking) were revised by the USACE and USEPA under the 'Compensatory Mitigation Rule'. These new federal regulations established mitigation banks as the preferred method for compensatory mitigation and also introduced ecosystem services into the standards for mitigation banking.

By 2024, more than 1200 mitigation banks had been approved and were operating in the United States with a total of 750,000 credits approved across the country. However, state and regional studies on wetland compensatory mitigation suggest that a significant portion of compensation sites are failing to meet administrative and ecological performance standards, according to the Environmental Law Institute.

== Conservation easements ==
In the United States, for land to be used for mitigation banking, a commitment to protecting these lands must be made using a legal agreement called a conservation easement. This is a voluntary legal arrangement between a landowner and a government agency or conservation organisation to restrict future commercial or residential development on a site, permanently setting it aside to be managed for conservation purposes. This may include a dedicated trust fund to finance the continued long-term management of the site for mitigation banking.

The Internal Revenue Service (a US federal revenue agency) has viewed the filing of a perpetual conservation easement in return for mitigation credits as a sale or exchange of property under section 1001 for federal income tax purposes.

Monitoring and enforcement are required to make sure that the terms of the conservation easement are maintained and long-term investment into conservation continues in perpetuity. Despite this, concerns remain over successfully monitoring and enforcing these agreements in practice.

Setting aside land for mitigation banking in perpetuity might be regarded as a disadvantage for landowners, who may want to use the land in different ways for their own needs in the future (such as for agriculture or development) or may face a reduction in the value of their land. On the other hand, using a conservation easement to permanently set aside the site of a mitigation bank might be regarded as beneficial for the achievement of broader goals for biodiversity conservation and in preventing future damage to wetland habitats and their biodiversity.

== See also ==
- Environmental mitigation – Measures to avoid, minimise, or compensate for adverse impacts on the environment
- Biodiversity banking – Market-based system for biodiversity offsetting
- No net loss environmental policy – Environmental policy approach
- No net loss policy in the United States – Environmental policy goal for wetland conservation in the United States
- Payment for ecosystem services – Incentives offered to farmers or landowners
