= No net loss policy in the United States =

Environmental policy goal for wetland conservation in the United States

"No Net loss" is the United States government's overall policy goal regarding wetlands preservation. The goal is to balance wetland loss due to economic development with wetlands reclamation, mitigation, and restorations efforts, so the total acreage of wetlands in the country remains constant or increases.

To achieve this objective, the federal government uses environmental mitigation tools which legally protect wetlands, provide rules and regulations for citizens and corporations provide rules and regulations for citizens and corporations interacting with wetlands, and incentivize the preservation and conservation of wetlands. For example, wetland mitigation banking, a system of market-based debits and credits where projects to restore and enhance the wetlands are carried out in advance of impacts, is used.

Land that is saturated with surface water or groundwater for long periods of time so that animals and plants adapt to them for a part of their lifecycle are considered wetlands. This includes areas that are inundated with fresh or saline water. Lagoons, lakes, rivers, estuaries, swamps, coral reefs, and seagrass beds are examples of wetlands.

Wetland ecosystem services provide many public benefits, such as flood control, nutrient farming, habitat, water filtration, and recreational area. It is estimated that over half the acreage of wetlands in the United States has been lost within the last three centuries, causing great concern to local, state, and federal agencies as well as the public interest they serve. The world has lost over 87% of wetlands since the 1700s.

Healthy wetlands provide services to local and regional communities such as nurseries for fisheries, tourism opportunities, grazing, and agriculture. Swamps and rivers provide a cultural focus for many regional communities.

At a larger level, No Net Loss will only be achieved if the incentives in the system are aligned. The project needs to be designed in a way that is deliverable in ways that make it tangible, measurable and meaningful for people and biodiversity. The government organizations need to set clear and well-enforced legislation to ensure developers are not undercut by compensation. Developers should have incentives and be educated on the topic. They should support positive biodiversity impacts and a biodiverse outcome.

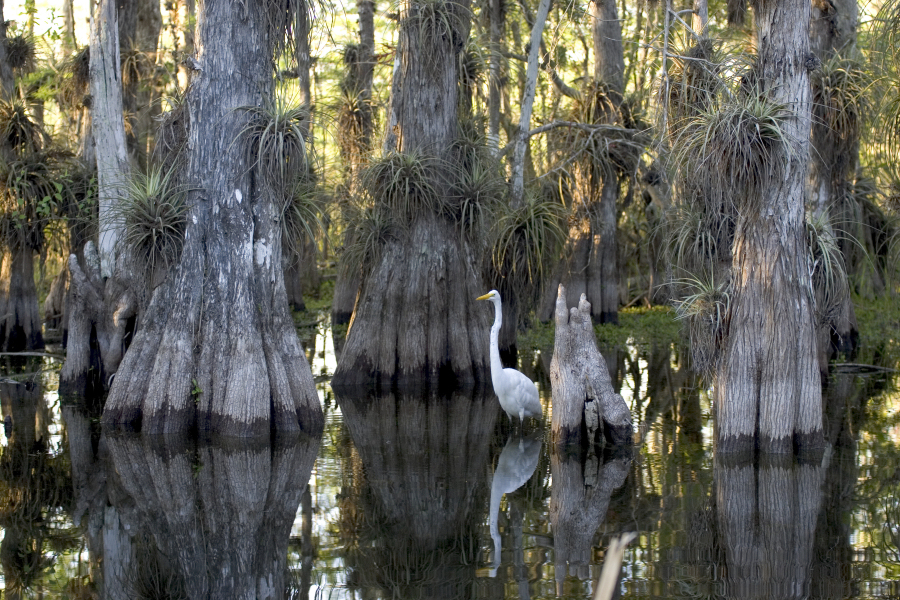
Wetland in Everglades National Park

== Origins ==
Since the 18th century, wetland area has decreased from nearly 220 million acres (890,000 km^{2}) in the lower 48 states to 107.7 million acres (436,000 km^{2}) in 2004. Since the 1950s, over fifty percent of this loss has come from wetlands being transitioned to agricultural lands. Other contributing factors include, but are not limited to, development and forestry.

Over one billion of the world's population rely on fish harvested from wetlands as their primary protein source. For another two billion people, fish harvested from wetlands accounts for 15% of their diet. Wetlands are home to over 100,000 biodiverse species of plants, animals, and bacteria. Wetlands are crucial to the development of society, annually accounting for more than a billion services and jobs, valued at $47 billion worldwide.

No Net Loss as a goal for wetland's policy was recommended in 1987 at the National Wetlands Policy Forum. It was first adopted by President George H.W. Bush administration in 1989. The policy, which represented compromise between development and conservation, was grounded on needs to protect wetlands by restoring wetlands and creating wetlands . The United States is not the only nation interested in the conservation of wetlands. International cooperation exists in the form of the Ramsar Convention on Wetlands.

== Definition ==
No Net Loss is a mitigation policy goal aiming to prevent and offset the destruction or degradation of wetlands. Under this bi-partisan policy, wetlands currently in existence are to be conserved if possible. No Net Loss is achieved through a coordinated effort of:

- wetlands protection
- wetlands creation
- wetlands restoration, enhancement, and management
- education, research, and information on wetlands

== No Net Loss policy under past administrations ==
"No Net Loss" of wetlands was first adopted as a national goal under Jimmy Carter's administration in 1977. This was under the Executive Order 11990. George H. W. Bush's administration in 1989, emphasized three elements on its policy: strengthening the wetland conservation and acquisition measures, revising the delineation manual, and improving and streamlining the wetlands regulatory program. These measures aimed to maintain the quality and quantity of wetlands biodiversity.

=== Bill Clinton ===
During his presidency, Bill Clinton's administration reiterated the same pledge by endorsing and updating the No Net Loss policy. The Clinton administration's commitment was to increase the fairness, flexibility, and speed of permit issuances over dredged or fill materials into waters as part of the implementation of the Section 404 of the Clean Water Act (CWA). It aimed to resolve differences in the delineation of wetlands area. The administration committed to increasing funding for wetland restoration measures, such as Wetland Reserve Program under the United States Department of Agriculture, voluntary wetlands restoration programs, non-regulatory conservation initiatives, and mitigation banks. The Clinton administration's 1998 Clean Water Action Plan aimed for an annual net gain of 100,000 acres (400 km^{2}) of wetlands.

=== George W. Bush ===
The administration of George W. Bush endorsed the No Net Loss goal in December 2002, when it released the National Wetlands Mitigation Action Plan. This outlined improvements to be implemented in wetland protection and mitigation by the Army Corps of Engineers, the Environmental Protection Agency, the National Oceanic Atmospheric Administration, the Department of the Interior, the Department of Agriculture, and the Federal Highway Administration. Additional action by the Bush administration included a push to clarify and redefine wetlands under the CWA. This proposal, published on January 10, 2003, guided federal agencies to not require CWA permits for non-navigable and isolated wetlands.

=== Barack Obama ===
Following the lead of the previous three presidential administrations, Barack Obama pledged his commitment to No Net Loss. The Obama administration increased funding of the North American Wetlands Conservation Act to ensure No Net Loss consistency, though funding was cut in the 2011 budget. Obama campaigned to amend the CWA and to extend the Swampbuster program, however these commitments were not carried out. Obama's administration was working with Congress to amend the CWA so isolated wetlands would fall under the Act's protection.

== No Net Loss policy under current administration ==
=== Donald Trump ===
The Trump administration departed from the "No Net Loss" wetlands policy through regulatory rollbacks and funding proposals. CWA protections were narrowed, excluding isolated and ephemeral wetlands under administrative rules and the Supreme Court's Sackett v. EPA decision limiting jurisdiction to wetlands with a continuous surface connection. Budget plans proposed cuts of over 30% to the Environmental Protection Agency, reducing enforcement and restoration capacity. Environmental groups estimated that tens of millions of acres lost protection, with associated risks of flooding and pollution.

== Reasoning for Wetland Restoration ==
Restoring wetlands provides benefits and can present a valuable and cost-effective opportunity for enhancing society's health and well-being. Restoration interventions can help improve and restore ecosystems previously impacted by anthropogenic disturbances, and often involves the purchase of uplands in various conditions. This process can help increase the heterogeneity of wetland functions and its biodiversity.

Per the NRDC: Wetlands in the conterminous United States store an estimated 11.5 billion metric tons of soil carbon, with freshwater inland wetlands holding 10.7 billion metric tons. Peat soils cover only 3% of Earth’s land, yet they store one-third of global soil carbon. Peatlands at present provide the greatest carbon storage capacity of any terrestrial ecosystem (550 billion MT of carbon worldwide or 42% of soil carbon), but they are deeply vulnerable. While all the above-mentioned wetlands will initially store more carbon as atmospheric carbon dioxide (CO2) levels rise, peatlands will release carbon with increased warming, not store it.

== Policy instruments ==
Aiming to meet the United States' policy objectives under the International Ramsar Convention and the national goal of No Net Loss of wetlands, various policy instruments are used within and between the federal, state and local spheres, alongside the private sector. Due to 70% of wetlands being on private lands, cooperation between government agencies and landholders is crucial to most policy implementation approaches.

=== Federal ===
==== Command and Control Regulation under the Clean Water Act ====
Under the Commerce Clause in the United States Constitution, the federal government derives authority to regulate pollution of United States waters if interstate commerce is affected. The Clean Water Act, in particular §404, regulates discharge into "waters of the United States". Permitting is required under the CWA §404 for activities that dredge or fill in this jurisdiction, which can include wetlands. Under this permitting program, environmental impacts are to be avoided if possible, reduced and mitigated if necessary. Permits are limited to five years and use public notice and comment procedures. While the U.S. Army Corps of Engineers issues the permit, responsibility for enforcement is shared between the U.S. Army Corps of Engineers and the EPA. However, the scope of what constitutes a wetland and thus what falls under CWA command and control regulation has changed over time. Two recent Supreme Court decisions have impacted the definition of wetlands under the Clean Water Act:

Rapanos et ux, et al. v. United States (2006)

- determination of whether or not a wetland falls under the definitions of "water of the United States" was not limitless
- wetlands adjacent to navigable waters are "waters of the United States"
- no clear definition of navigable waters or majority opinion so jurisdiction under the CWA if one of the following two standards is met:
  - Justice Kennedy's Test: a "significant nexus" must be found between the wetland and traditional navigable waters
  - Plurality Test: a "continuous surface connection" needs to flow between the wetland and navigable waters

===== Solid Waste Agency of Northern Cook County (SWANCC) v. United States Army Corps of Engineers (2001) =====
- rejection of migratory bird habitats to constitute as intrastate waters
- determined the Migratory Bird Rule, under which the Army Corps of Engineers extended jurisdiction for §404 to include migratory bird habitat, was outside the scope of authority granted in the CWA
- Other key federal policy instruments

Program	Agency	Year Implemented	Purpose
Conservation Reserve Program	FSA	Farm Bill	Conservation Easement
Wetlands Reserve Program	NRCS	1990 Farm Bill	Conservation Easement
Swampbuster Provision	USDA	1985 Food Security Act	Converting wetlands to croplands results in a loss of federal funds
Migratory Bird Rule	Army Corps of Engineers & EPA	1996	Overturned by U.S. Supreme Court in 2001
Migratory Bird Hunting and Conservation Stamp Act	USFWS & State Wildlife Agencies	1934	Fee on consumptive use of waterfowl to fund conservation efforts (such as SWAP)
§101, 303, 319, 402 of Clean Water Act	EPA	1972	Command and Control Regulations on discharge of pollutants into waterways
Water Bank Act	USDA	1970	Allows trading of wetlands mitigation property rights
217 of Coastal Zone Act Reauthorization Amendments (CZARA)	EPA	1990	Voluntary Program
EPA Grants	EPA	Various	Provides direct funding for projects through a competitive grant process

Additional federal policy instruments include private-public sector collaborations such as educational efforts, conservation easement programs, land banking, and numerous voluntary programs.

=== State ===
States government tools for addressing wetland protection, include but are not limited to:

- Police powers to regulate use of water and land
- Zoning authority
- Land use designation
- Benchmarks regulating net gain or loss
- State Wetland Conservation Plans
- Wetlands mitigation banking (compensatory mitigation where wetlands credits are acquired through the restoration of wetland areas and can be used or sold through market trading)

=== Local ===
Local Wetland Protection Local governments tools for addressing wetland protection, include but are not limited to:

- Stakeholder involvement
- Local Wetland Strategic Plans (outlining conservation opportunities, research, and wetlands management)
- Ordinances regarding protection, zoning and development plans
- Local wetlands mitigation banking

== Barriers to Implementation ==
Interest groups and constituents can lobby or exploit political influence to receive exemptions or change the scope of wetlands policy. Likewise, politicians and bureaucrats may change the scope of wetlands policy and its implementation to cater to constituents and generate political goodwill.

Spending on wetlands policy leads to opportunity cost associated with foregone agricultural and development use. The value of wetland services, such as recreation, flood control, and filtration must be considered, as well as the value wetlands confer on surrounding property through hedonic pricing. This may be challenging due to lacking consensus on a valuation system for wetlands.

The processes of wetland restoration, including restoring it to its original function and becoming stable enough as a wetland ecosystem, takes many years. Those processes are expensive. Based on the study done in the Kentucky Bottomland Forest, the wetland restoration takes forty-two years, particularly the process of 95% of the carbon accumulation that is stored in natural wetland. Therefore, in achieving the No Net Loss wetlands policy goal in relation to area, it is often questionable whether those efforts are worth with the expense for the quality

== See also ==
- Mitigation banking
- Environmental mitigation
- Wetlands of the United States
- Wetland conservation in the United States
- Clean Water Act
- Ramsar Convention
