= Economics of biodiversity =

Economic importance of biodiversity

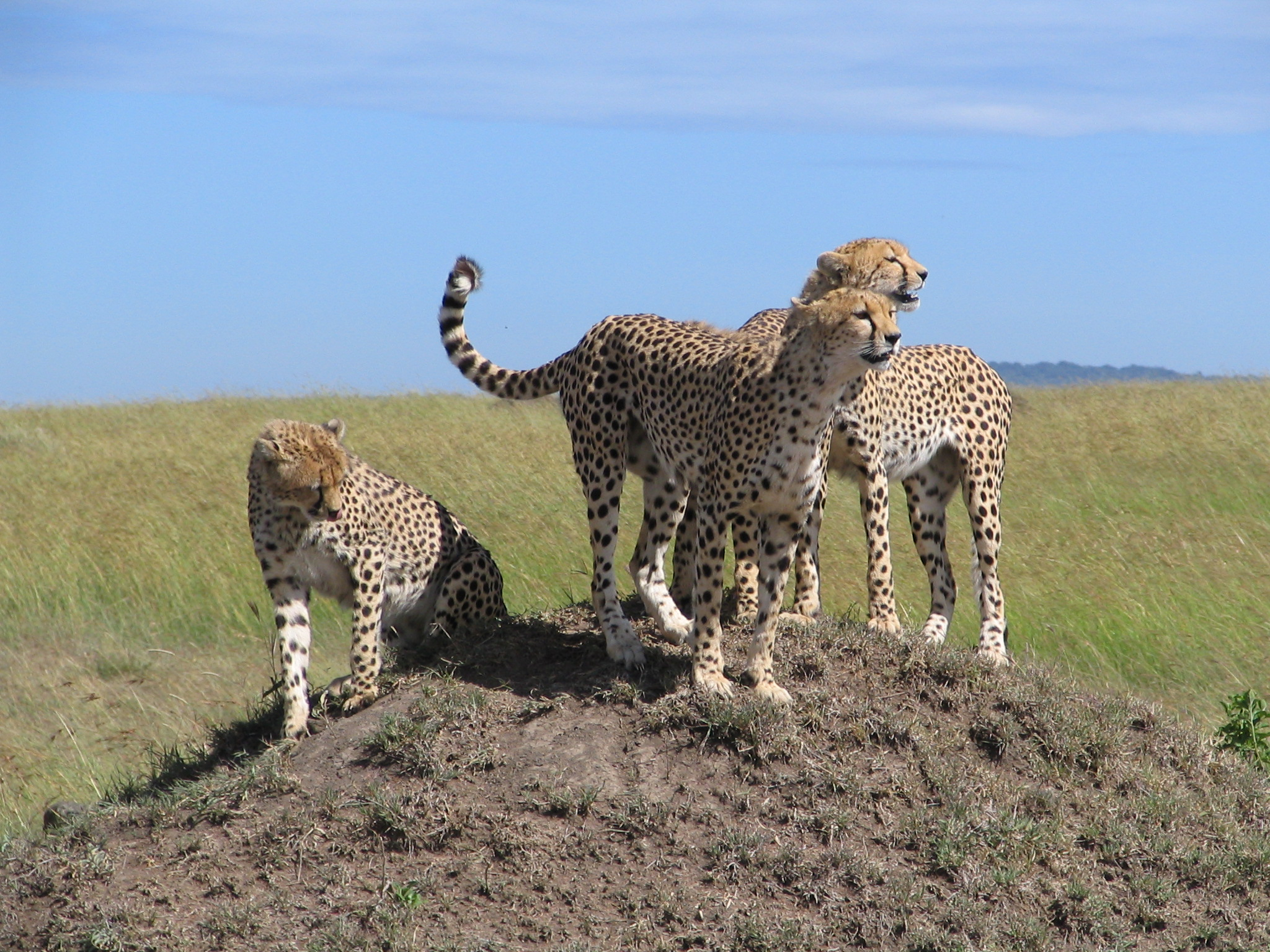
The biodiversity of the Masai Mara nature reserve in Kenya is a tourist attraction

Biodiversity plays an essential role in the global economy. This includes its role in providing ecosystem services - the benefits that humans get from ecosystems. Biodiversity plays a major role in the productivity and functioning of ecosystems, affects their ability to provide ecosystem services. For example, biodiversity is a source of food, medication, and materials used in industry. Recreation and tourism are also examples of human economic activities that rely on these benefits. In 2018, the WWF Living Planet Report argues that the whole global economy of US$125 trillion ultimately relies on nature.

The benefits of biodiversity are often evaluated in an anthropocentric way and the inherent value of biodiversity, outside of its benefits to humanity, has been debated by economists. Despite these benefits, economic activities often result in harm to biodiversity, such as through deforestation.

The majority of species have yet to be evaluated for their current or future economic importance. Raw materials, pharmaceuticals and drug production all directly and indirectly depend upon biodiversity.

== Agriculture and food ==
Biodiversity plays an essential economic role in agriculture as the origin of all crops and domesticated livestock, contributing both to food security and to livelihoods. Around 25% of the global population is estimated to work in agriculture. Estimating the economic value of biodiversity (and the costs of its continued loss) in agriculture and through the use of wild species for food is both challenging and controversial.

Agricultural biodiversity (agrobiodiversity) refers to all the components of biodiversity that are relevant to food and agriculture, and that make up agricultural ecosystems. More specifically, the term food biodiversity refers to the diversity of organisms used for food. Agrobiodiversity provides income through food and raw materials, as well as by supporting ecosystem services that are essential for agricultural productivity, including pollination, pest control, nutrient cycling, and climate regulation.

Income is generated from the harvest and sale of wild species, as well as from those that have been cultivated and domesticated. This can play an important role in supporting the livelihoods of people living in developing economies. For example, wild meat (bushmeat) is harvested by rural households in some countries to support dietary requirements and as a source of subsistence income, though the practice is controversial. The trade in bushmeat occurs both legally and illegally, for cultural reasons as well as socio-economic ones.

Biodiversity includes genetic diversity, providing genetic resources for food and agriculture. The term genetic resources refers to "genetic material of actual or potential value", according to the Convention on Biological Diversity. These resources are important as the raw material for evolution by natural and artificial selection to enable the development of new cultivars with higher yields, greater tolerance to abiotic stresses, and greater resistance to pests and diseases. The role of genetic diversity in reducing risk to commercial output from farms or forests has been said to contribute to the indirect economic value of biodiversity. Genetic resources may also be used in biotechnology, such as for genetic engineering, though concerns have been raised that the use of such methods could increase genetic erosion. Estimating the economic value of conserving such resources is difficult and their global value is largely unquantified as a result.

About 70% of crop genetic diversity and 30% of livestock genetic diversity has been lost. The loss of genetic diversity reduces the resilience of food systems to pests, diseases, abiotic stresses, and climate change, posing a threat to food security. These risks can reduce yields, therefore having an economic and social impact. In addition, species diversity (an aspect of biodiversity) in the global food system is relatively low when compared to the total number of described species; it was estimated that only 40 species of mammals and birds have been domesticated for agriculture and less than 200 plant species are produced on a significant scale globally. This compares to a total of approximately 6,400 mammal species, 11,000 avian species, and 391,000 plant species (out of which 6,000 have been cultivated for food and agriculture).

Despite the importance of biodiversity to agriculture and its role in the global economy, the global food system is thought to be a primary driver of biodiversity loss, according to the United Nations Environment Programme. For example, this may occur as a result of deforestation and land use change for agricultural expansion.

=== Biological pest control ===
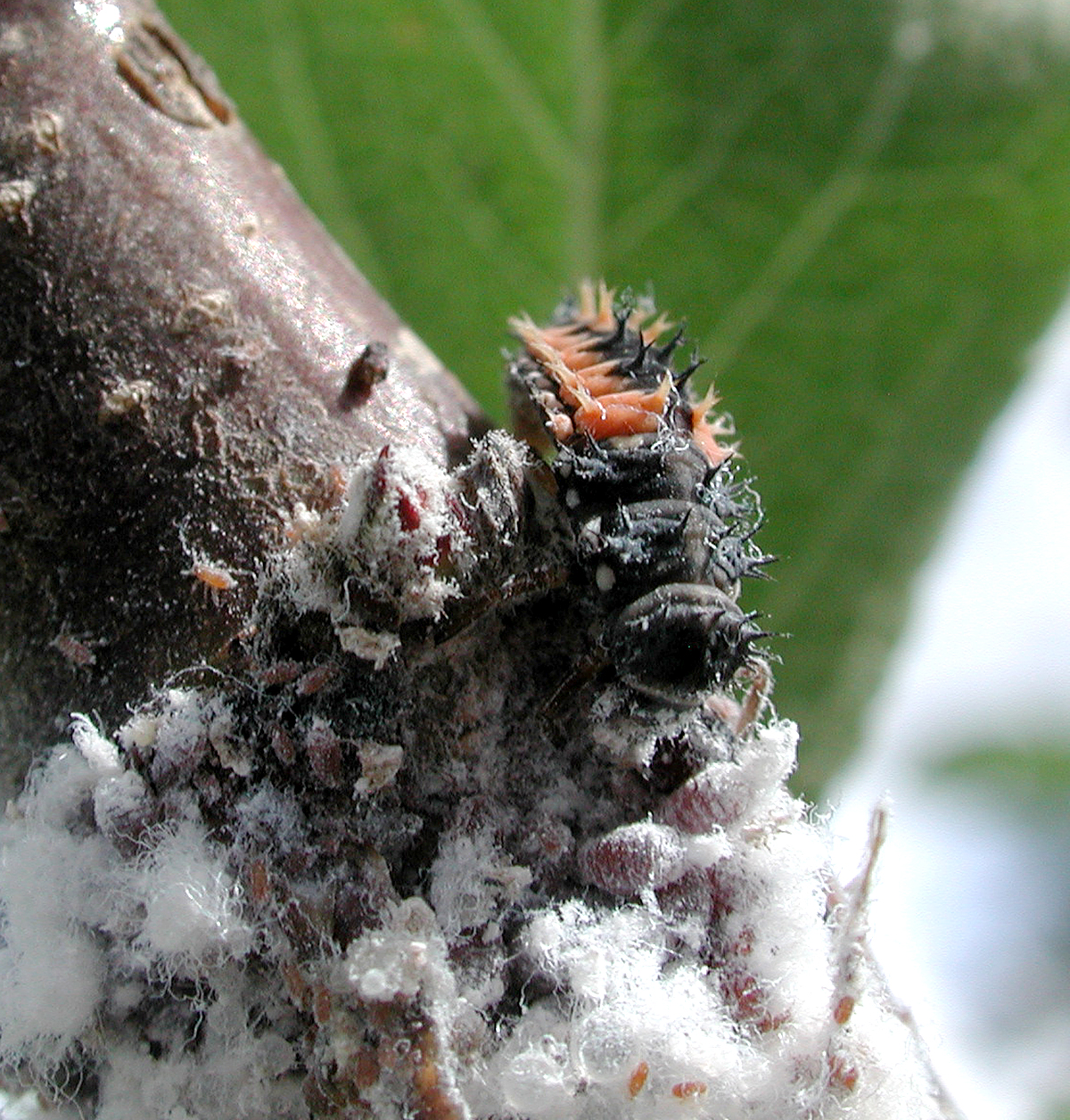
A ladybird larva eating aphids

An important ecosystem function associated with biodiversity is pest control. Control species can suppress pest populations and reduce loss of crop yields without the negative impacts of chemical pesticides. This has economic benefits and maintaining natural pest control is important to humanity's ability to grow crops. It can also be applied within horticulture.

Biological pest control can reduce economic losses incurred as a result of pests, disease vectors, and invasive species. However, its use can have unintended effects where control species are introduced without adequate research. For example, the cane toad was introduced to Queensland, Australia in 1935 to control cane beetles that attack sugarcane roots but are now regarded as an invasive species through their damaging impacts on native species.

=== Horticulture ===
Horticulture refers to the small-scale cultivation of plants, such as for use in gardening. It encompasses both domesticated and wild species, cultivars, genotypes, and alleles. These plants may be used for food, medicine, or aesthetic and ornamental purposes. Horticultural plant biodiversity can be highly profitable and provides opportunities for employment. In the UK, growth of ornamental plants was worth £1.7 billion in 2023.

Originally, plants for horticultural use were sourced from wild populations, but now tend to come from nurseries, botanical gardens, and private collections.

=== Aquaculture and fishing ===
Aquaculture and fishing are underpinned by biodiversity, with significant economic importance globally. By 2006, over 3 billion people were dependent on marine and coastal biodiversity for their livelihoods and 38 million people were estimated to be directly employed by fishing. In 2023, the global fishing market was estimated to be worth $656.96 billion, based on revenue.

== Medicine ==
Biodiversity plays a vital role in the maintenance of human health and a wide variety of products derived from plants, animals, and fungi are used in medicine. Biodiversity acts as a source of medicinal compounds, impacts the provision of ecosystem services that improve health and protect against disease, and as an inspiration for biomedical techniques that could be utilised to cure diseases (such as CRISPR/Cas9). Over 40% of pharmaceutical products are derived from nature, identified through indigenous knowledge and scientific methods, and 70% of all cancer drugs are natural or bioinspired products. This has significant economic implications. For example, the market for traditional medicine was predicted to reach a value of $115 billion by the end of 2023.

Wild plant species have been used for medicinal purposes since pre-historic times and over 60% of the world's population still depends on herbal medicine as their primary source of healthcare. Some major antimalarial drugs are derived from plants. For example, quinine, derived from the bark of South American Cinchona trees is used as an anti-malarial. Artemisinin, another anti-malarial, was isolated from sweet wormwood by Tu Youyou. In addition, anti-cancer drugs like Taxol, Vincristine, and Vinblastine were isolated from plants.

== Industry ==
Beyond agriculture and pharmaceuticals, biodiversity plays an important role in industry. It acts as a source of natural resources, materials, and products that are sold, consumed, or used in manufacturing. Many livelihoods are dependent on biodiversity as a result. Examples of some of the raw materials that originate from biodiversity include wood, plant fibers (such as cotton), animal fibers (such as wool and silk).

Ecosystem services, relied upon by industry and businesses, are underpinned by biodiversity. As a result, estimates of the value of these services to the global economy have been made, though this practice is controversial, with an estimate of US$125 trillion a year worldwide by WWF's 2018 Living Planet Report.

Biodiversity includes the morphological diversity of life forms. This can provide economic opportunities as inspiration for research and development of industrial materials and structures. For example, the ridges on pectoral fins of humpback whales have inspired the shape of wind turbine blades. The field of biomimetics is dedicated to the emulation of models, systems, and elements from nature to solve complex human problems. In the United States, biomimicry is estimated to account for $425 billion of the country's GDP, according to the Fermanian Business and Economic Institute. This provides potential economic opportunities for developing countries with high levels of biodiversity, but has mainly been explored in developed economies.

== Tourism and recreation ==
Through cultural ecosystem services, biodiversity provides economic benefits in the form of recreation and tourism, while also benefitting human wellbeing. Biodiversity influences the potential of ecosystems to provide recreational services. This includes outdoor recreation, such as hiking, hunting, fishing, and wildlife watching.

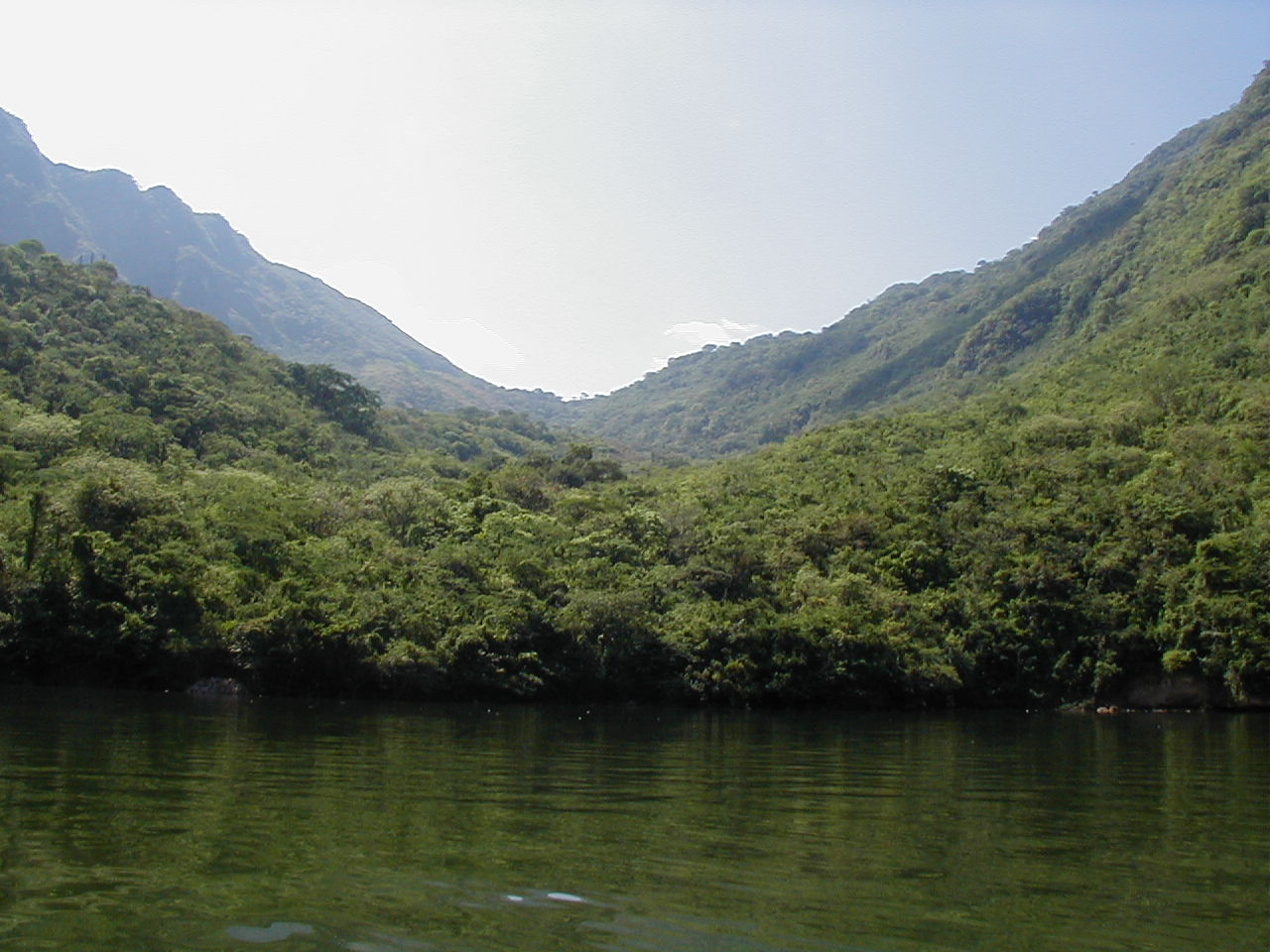
Sumidero Canyon Ecological Reserve in Sumidero Canyon — in the state of Chiapas, Southwestern Mexico.

Another form of recreation supported by biodiversity is tourism. Biodiversity is "at the heart of what drives the tourism industry", according to the United Nations Environment Programme. The beauty of tourist destinations or the species they support can attract tourists to visit certain areas. For example, destinations like rainforests, beaches, national parks, and nature reserves are attractive to tourists. The revenue generated through tourism is vital to many economies worldwide and accounts for 10% of the global job market.

Nature-based tourism, such as to visit protected areas, also has an important economic impact. For example, ecotourism, where the motivation of tourists is to observe and appreciate nature and the cultures in natural areas, while supporting their maintenance. In 2023, the global ecotourism market was estimated to be worth US$216.49 billion.

Despite the economic benefits from biodiversity through tourism, the tourism industry has negative impacts on biodiversity. For example, through habitat destruction and pollution. As a result, sustainable tourism emerged with the aim of reducing the negative impacts of tourism on the environment.

== Illegal wildlife trade ==
The illegal wildlife trade profits from biodiversity through the sale of products derived from non-domesticated animals, including those classed as endangered by the IUCN. According to the Zoological Society of London, the illegal wildlife trade is estimated to be worth $23 billion a year. Cultural demand (such as for bushmeat or use in traditional medicine) is one factor motivating the illegal wildlife trade, however, terrorist and criminal organisations engage in illicit trafficking of plants and animals to fund the purchase of weapons, fund civil conflicts, and other illegal activities.

Exploitation of biodiversity through wildlife smuggling has a negative impact on biodiversity itself, including by driving population declines, species extinctions, and the loss of genetic diversity. It can also impact biodiversity through biosecurity risks, including the potential to spread diseases that native populations may not be resistant to and through the introduction of alien species.

== Impact of economic activity on biodiversity ==
Despite the role of biodiversity in underpinning the economy, economic activities often cause harm to biodiversity and the economic incentives they provide mean that they are often favoured over conservation and restoration activities. This contributes to the loss of biodiversity observed on a global scale with numerous causes, such as habitat loss, land-use change, pollution, and overexploitation.

According to an estimate from BCG, more than 90% of the anthropogenic drivers of biodiversity loss result from economic activities linked to agriculture, infrastructure, fashion, and energy. In addition, the IUCN estimates that 79% of threatened species are impacted by agriculture, infrastructure, and energy and mining activities.

The failure to halt terrestrial biodiversity loss between 2000 and 2010 was estimated to cost the global economy $500 billion. Continued biodiversity loss and environmental degradation poses a long-term risk to society and the economy, such as by increasing the risk of pandemics, floods, and droughts.

== See also ==
- Biodiversity Action Plan
- Biodiversity finance/The Economics of Ecosystems and Biodiversity
- Environmental economics
- Endangered Species Recovery Plan
- Ecosystem services
- Food biodiversity
- Agrobiodiversity
- Biodiversity and drugs
- Payment for ecosystem services (PES)
