= Glossary of climate change =

This glossary of climate change is a list of definitions of terms and concepts relevant to climate change, global warming, and related topics. The Intergovernmental Panel on Climate Change (IPCC) with the United Nations Framework Convention on Climate Change (UNFCCC) use tens of acronyms and initialisms in documents relating to climate change policy.

== 0–9 ==
100,000-year problem
The apparent discrepancy between the climate response and the forcing from the amount of incoming solar radiation.

== A ==
adaptation
Any adjustment in natural or human systems in response to a changing or changed climate.
additionality
In the context of a project funded by carbon offsets, the additionality is the reduction in greenhouse gas emissions that is in addition to what would have resulted in the absence of the carbon offset funding.
albedo
An index of the "reflectiveness" of a surface; a way of quantifying how much radiation is reflected back, as opposed to absorbed. Objects or surfaces with low albedo (closer to 0) absorb most of the radiation directed toward them, and those with high albedo (closer to 1) reflect most of it.
anoxic event
A period when the Earth's oceans have no oxygen below the surface layer.
Antarctic bottom water (ABW) – Cold, dense, water mass originating in the Southern Ocean surrounding Antarctica
Antarctic oscillation (AAO)
A low-frequency mode of atmospheric variability of the Southern Hemisphere.
anthropogenic climate change
Climate change created, caused, or strongly influenced by humans or human activities.
anthropogenic global warming (AGW)
Global warming with the presumption of human influence.
anti-greenhouse effect
The cooling effect an atmosphere has on the ambient temperature of a planet or moon, such as Titan.
Arctic amplification
See Polar amplification. A positive feedback loop triggered by the melting of sea ice, which results in the replacement of high-albedo ice with low-albedo sea capable of absorbing more radiation from the Sun, which traps more heat near the Earth's surface and contributes to the melting of more ice.
Arctic dipole anomaly
A pressure pattern characterized by high pressure on the arctic regions of North America and low pressure on those of Eurasia.
Arctic oscillation (AO)
The dominant pattern of non-seasonal sea-level pressure (SLP) variations north of 20 degrees N, and it is characterized by SLP anomalies of one sign in the Arctic and anomalies of opposite sign centered about 37–45 degrees N. See also North Atlantic oscillation.
Arctic shrinkage
The observed decrease in sea ice in the Arctic Ocean and melting of the Greenland Ice Sheet in recent years.
Argo
An international programme for researching the ocean
Assigned amount unit
tonne of carbon under the Kyoto Protocol
Atlantic Multidecadal Oscillation (AMO)
A hypothesised mode of natural variability occurring in the North Atlantic Ocean and which has its principle expression in the sea surface temperature (SST) field.
atmospheric window
The parts of the electromagnetic spectrum that are, with the Earth's atmosphere in its natural state, not absorbed at all.
attribution of recent climate change
The study of the causes of climate change.

== B ==
Biofuels
Biomass
is a term used in several contexts: in ecology, it means living organisms, and in bioenergy, it means matter from recently living (but now dead) organisms. However, Biomass is defined as all plants and plant-derived materials including feedstock such as vegetable oils, forestry residues, wastes from pulp and paper mills, urban wood wastes, animal manure, plants, grains, and animal-based oils.
Blytt–Sernander system
Bond event
Bunker fuels
fuels consumed for international marine transport, e.g shipping fleets.

== C ==
Callendar effect
cap and trade
See emissions trading.
Capacity building
In the context of climate change, capacity building is the process of developing the technical skills and institutional capability in developing countries and economies in transition to enable them to address effectively the causes and results of climate change.
carbon cycle
The biogeochemical cycle by which carbon is exchanged between the biosphere, geosphere, hydrosphere, and atmosphere of the Earth.
carbon dioxide
CO2 the main greenhouse gas
carbon footprint
The total set of greenhouse gas emissions caused by an organization, event or product.
carbon offset
A mechanism for individuals and businesses to neutralize rather than actually reduce their greenhouse gas emissions, by purchasing the right to claim someone else's reductions as their own.
carbon sequestration
Proposals for removing CO_{2} from the atmosphere, or for preventing CO_{2} from fossil fuel combustion from reaching the atmosphere.
carbon sink
An artificial or natural reservoir, such as rocks or peat bogs, that accumulates and stores some carbon-containing chemical compound for an indefinite period.
carbon tax
A tax on energy sources or agricultural or industrial processes which emit carbon dioxide.
clathrate gun hypothesis
The hypothesis that melting methane clathrates could trigger runaway or very severe global warming.
climate
The average and variations of weather in a region over long periods of time, which can be related to surface variables such as temperature, precipitation and wind.
climate change
Includes both global warming and its effects, such as changes to precipitation, rising sea levels, and impacts that differ by region.
climate change denial

climate change feedback
A natural phenomenon that may increase or decrease the warming that eventually results from a change in radiative forcing.
climate change mitigation
approaches to limit global warming, primarily by the substitution of fossil fuels with low-carbon sources of energy
climate commitment
How much future warming is "committed", even if greenhouse gas levels do not rise, due to thermal inertia, mainly of the oceans.
Climate crisis
Term used to show a sense of emergency and urgency about climate change.
climate cycle
See climate oscillation.
climate ethics
An area of research that focuses on the ethical dimensions of climate change.
climate forcing
Also called radiative forcing - an energy imbalance imposed on the climate system either externally or by human activities.
climate inertia
The tendency of a climate system to resist changes.
climate justice
A term used for viewing climate change as an ethical issue, and considering how its causes and effects relate to social and political concepts of justice.
climate legislation
Legislation dealing with regulation of greenhouse gas emissions.
climate model
An imperfect representation of a climate system that is constructed, validated, studied, and often improved upon in order to gain a knowingly limited amount of useful information.
climate movement
climate oscillation
climate resilience
The capacity for a socio-ecological system to: (1) absorb stresses and maintain function in the face of external stresses imposed upon it by climate change and (2) adapt, reorganize, and evolve into more desirable configurations that improve the sustainability of the system, leaving it better prepared for future climate change impacts, while still being able to benefit from it now.
climate sensitivity
How responsive the temperature of the climate system is to a change in radiative forcing; also, the temperature change in °C associated with a doubling of the concentration of CO_{2} in the atmosphere (as the single most important factor of radiative forcing).
climate stabilization wedge
climate system
climate variability
Climate change with no presumption of cause.
climatology

The scientific study of climate, defined as weather conditions averaged over a long period of time.
cool tropics paradox

CDM
Clean Development Mechanism is an arrangement under the Kyoto Protocol allowing industrialised countries with a greenhouse gas reduction commitment (called Annex 1 countries) to invest in projects that reduce emissions in developing countries as an alternative to more expensive emission reductions in their own countries.
CDR
Carbon dioxide removal
CER
Certified Emission Reduction
CFC
Chlorofluorocarbon
CF_{4}
Carbon tetrafluoride
CH_{4}
Methane
COP
Conference of the Parties - the United Nations Climate Change Conference
CO_{2}
Carbon dioxide
C_{2}F_{6}
Hexafluoroethane

== D ==
Deforestation
Conversion of forest to non-forest.
dendroclimatology
desertification
The degradation of land in arid and dry sub-humid areas, resulting primarily from natural activities and influenced by climatic variations.
detection and attribution
See attribution of recent climate change.

DER
Distributed Energy Resources is a small-scale unit of power generation that operates locally and is connected to a larger power grid at the distribution level. DERs include solar panels, small natural gas-fueled generators, electric vehicles and controllable loads, such as HVAC systems and electric water heaters. An important distinction of a DER is that the energy it produces is often consumed close to the source.

== E ==
eco-efficiency
Creating more goods and services while using fewer resources and creating less waste and pollution.
Earth's atmosphere
The layer of gases surrounding the Earth and retained by the Earth's gravity.
Earth's energy imbalance
Difference between energy absorbed by Earth and energy radiated by Earth to space. A useful gauge of significant change when monitored over multiple decades.
Earthshine
Sunlight reflected from Earth and illuminating the dark side of the Moon, which help determining Earth's albedo.
ecotax
A fiscal policy that introduces taxes intended to promote ecologically sustainable activities via economic incentives.
ecosystem services
Benefits humans get from a multitude of resources and processes that are supplied by natural ecosystems.
El Niño-Southern Oscillation (ENSO)
A set of specific interacting parts of a single global system of coupled ocean-atmosphere climate fluctuations that come about as a consequence of oceanic and atmospheric circulations.
emission intensity
The average emission rate of a given pollutant from a given source relative to the intensity of a specific activity; for example grams of carbon dioxide released per megajoule of energy produced, or the ratio of greenhouse gas emissions produced to GDP.
emission inventory
emission standards
Requirements that set specific limits to the amount of pollutants that can be released into the environment.
emissions trading
enteric fermentation
Fermentation that takes place in the digestive systems of ruminant animals; one of the causes of methane emissions.
environmental crime
Crime against environmental legislation that is liable for prosecution.

== F ==
feedback
Either an amplification (positive feedback) or a reduction (negative feedback) of the rate of global warming caused by its own effects.
forest dieback
fossil fuel
Fossil source fuels, that is, hydrocarbons found within the top layer of the Earth's crust.
Freon
The trade name for a group of proprietary odorless, colorless, nonflammable, and noncorrosive chlorofluorocarbon and hydrochlorofluorocarbon refrigerants which are used in air conditioning and refrigeration systems.

== G ==
glacial earthquake
A large-scale temblor that occurs in glaciated areas where the glacier moves faster than one kilometer per year.
glacial motion
global cooling
A conjecture during the 1970s of imminent cooling of the Earth's surface and atmosphere along with a posited commencement of glaciation.
global climate model (GCM)

A computer model of the world's climate system, including the atmosphere and oceans.
global climate regime
global dimming
The observed decrease in surface insolation, that may have recently reversed.
global warming (GW)
Usually: the warming trend over the past century or so; also: any period in which the temperature of the Earth's atmosphere increases; also the theory of such changes.
global warming controversy
Socio-political issues surrounding the theory of global warming.
global warming denial
See climate change denial.
global warming period
Any period in which the temperature of the Earth's atmosphere increases.
global warming potential
A measure of how much a given mass of greenhouse gas is estimated to contribute to global warming.
greenhouse debt
greenhouse effect
greenhouse gas
Any gas that causes or contributes to greenhouse effect.
greenhouse gas inventory
A type of emission inventory that includes greenhouse gas emissions from source categories as well as removal by carbon sinks.
Gulf Stream
A powerful, warm, and swift Atlantic Ocean current that originates in the Gulf of Mexico, exits through the Strait of Florida, and follows the eastern coastlines of the United States and Newfoundland before crossing the Atlantic Ocean.

GCM
General circulation model or global climate model
GFDL
Geophysical Fluid Dynamics Laboratory
GHG
Greenhouse gas
GWP
Global warming potential

== H ==
historical temperature record
See global temperature record.
hockey stick graph
Reconstructions of Northern Hemisphere or global mean temperature changes during the past 600 to 11,300 years, a name coined for the Mann, Bradley and Hughes 1999 (MBH99) reconstruction.
Holocene
A geological period, which began approximately 11,550 calendar years BP (about 9600 BC) and continued to the Anthropocene.
Holocene Climatic Optimum
A warm period during roughly the interval 9,000 to 5,000 years BP.
homogenization
The removal of non-climatic jump and changes in raw climate records, for example due to relocations or changes in instrumentation.

HCFC
Hydrochlorofluorocarbon
HFC
Hydrofluorocarbon
H_{2}O
Water vapor

== I ==
IAS emissions
This is an acronym used in UK carbon budgets meaning greenhouse gas emissions from "international and shipping".
ice age
A period of long-term reduction in the temperature of Earth's climate, resulting in expansions of continental ice sheets, polar ice sheets, and alpine glaciers.
ice core
A core sample from the accumulation of snow and ice over many years that have re-crystallized and have trapped air bubbles from previous time periods.
insolation
The amount of solar radiation reaching the surface of the Earth.
IMO
In climate change context, It is an acronym for International Maritime Organization.
invasive species
Any non-native, introduced species that adversely affects the habitats and bioregions it invades economically, environmentally, and/or ecologically.
iris hypothesis
irradiance
The amount of electromagnetic radiation reaching a surface, measured in watts per square meter.
instrumental temperature record
Shows the fluctuations of the temperature of the atmosphere and the oceans as measured by temperature sensors. The longest-running quasi-global record starts in 1850.
Interdecadal Pacific Oscillation (IPO)
A cycle of 15 to 30 years between warm or cool waters in the north and south Pacific Ocean.
Intergovernmental Panel on Climate Change (IPCC)
IUCN
International Union for Conservation of Nature.
JUSSCANNZ
This is an acronym representing non-EU industrialized countries that occasionally meet to discuss various issues related to climate change. Members include Japan, the United States, Switzerland, Canada, Australia, Norway, and New Zealand. Iceland, Mexico, and the Republic of Korea may also attend JUSSCANZ meetings.

IOD
Indian Ocean Dipole
IPO
Interdecadal Pacific oscillation
IPCC
Intergovernmental Panel on Climate Change

== K ==
Keeling Curve
A graph showing the variation in concentration of atmospheric carbon dioxide since 1958.
Kyoto Protocol
A modification to the United Nations Framework Convention on Climate Change. See also post–Kyoto Protocol negotiations on greenhouse gas emissions.

== L ==
Little Ice Age
A historical period of cooling which followed a warmer period known as the Medieval Climate Optimum.

LT-LEDS
A long term climate strategy for a country submitted to the UNFCCC.

== M ==
magnetosphere
The region around an astronomical object in which phenomena are dominated or organized by its magnetic field.
Maunder Minimum
A historical period roughly from 1645 to 1715, when sunspots became exceedingly rare, as noted by solar observers of the time.
Mauna Loa
Home to the longest instrumental CO_{2} record.

MSL
Mean Sea Level

Medieval Warm Period
A historical warm period from about the 10th century to about the 14th century.
meteorology
The interdisciplinary scientific study of the atmosphere and weather processes, with a particular focus on weather forecasting.
methane
A greenhouse gas released by enteric fermentation in livestock, rice production, and fossil fuel extraction.
Milankovitch cycles
mitigation of global warming
Any procedure which involves taking actions to reduce greenhouse gas emissions and to enhance sinks aimed at reducing the degree of global warming. (same as climate change mitigation)
mode of variability
A pattern of climate change, usually oscillatory, with specific regional effects.

== N ==
nitrous oxide
N_{2}O is a potent greenhouse gas produced primarily in agriculture, particularly by the livestock sector.
nonradiative forcing
A type of climate forcing which creates an energy imbalance that does not immediately involve radiation.
North Atlantic Deep Water
One of the water masses of the ocean.
North Atlantic oscillation
An atmospheric climate mode.

NCDS
Nationally Determined Contributions (aka Paris Accord/Agreement)
NAPA
National Adaptation Programme of Action.
NCAR
National Center for Atmospheric Research
NF_{3}
Nitrogen trifluoride
N_{2}0
Nitrous oxide

== O ==
ocean heat content
Thermal energy stored in the global ocean. A basic indicator of climate change.
ocean planet
The opposite concept of Snowball Earth.
orbital forcing
ozone
ozone depletion
ozone layer

OHC
Ocean heat content
O_{3}
(Tropospheric) Ozone

== P ==
Pacific decadal oscillation (PDO)
A 23-year pattern of warm or cool water in the north Pacific Ocean.
Paleocene–Eocene Thermal Maximum (PETM)
A historical warming event which suddenly and fundamentally altered geological and biological aspects of the planet.
paleoclimatology
The study of climate change taken on the scale of the entire history of the Earth.
policies and measures (PaMs)
phenology
polar amplification
Greater temperature increases in the Arctic than in the earth as a whole is a result of the collective effect of positive feedback loops and other processes. Despite its name, polar amplification only applies to the Arctic, and not to the Antarctic, because the Southern Ocean acts as a heat sink.
polar city
A proposed human refuge located in northern regions of the Earth, and in Tasmania, New Zealand, and Antarctica, where people might have to live in order to survive major global warming "events" in the far distant future. Also dubbed "Lovelock Retreats".
proxy
A variable that can be related to one of interest (e.g. tree rings can be proxies for temperature variations).

== R ==
radiative forcing
A quantifiable driver of change to Earth's energy balance.
regime shift
removal unit
A tradable carbon credit or "Kyoto unit" representing an allowance to emit one tonne of greenhouse gases absorbed by a removal or carbon sink activity in an Annex I country.
runaway greenhouse effect
A somewhat ill-defined term associated with the idea of large irreversible temperature rises.

RCP
Representative Concentration Pathway
REDD
Reducing emissions from deforestation and forest degradation mechanisms use market/financial incentives to reduce the emission of greenhouse gases from deforestation and forest degradation.

== S ==
sea level rise
A basic indicator of global warming and climate change.
season creep
slash and burn
A form of deforestation used to clear fields for agricultural use.
Snowball Earth
solar variation
Changes in the amount of radiant energy emitted by the Sun.
solar wind
The stream of charged particles ejected from the upper atmosphere of the Sun.
stranded asset
Assets that have suffered from unanticipated or premature write-downs, devaluations, or conversion to liabilities. They can be caused by a variety of environment-related risks.
Stratospheric aerosol injection
sunspot
A region on the surface of the Sun (the photosphere) that is marked by a lower temperature than its surroundings and has intense magnetic activity, which inhibits convection, forming areas of low surface temperature.

SSP
Shared Socioeconomic Pathways
SST
Sea surface temperature
SF_{6}
Sulfur hexafluoride

== T ==
thermohaline circulation
The global density-driven circulation of the oceans.
TEX-86
A paleothermometer based on the composition of membrane lipids of the marine picoplankton Thermoproteota (formerly called Crenarchaeota).
thermocline

A layer within a body of water or air where the temperature changes rapidly with depth.
tipping points in the climate system
Thresholds in the climate system that, when exceeded, can lead to large changes in the state of the system that are often irreversible.

TEWI
Total equivalent warming impact

== U ==
urban heat island
Any metropolitan area which is significantly warmer than its surroundings.

== V ==
volcanism
Phenomenon of eruption of molten rock (magma) onto the surface of a solid-surface planet or moon, where lava, pyroclastics, and volcanic gases erupt through a break in the surface called a vent.

== W ==
water vapor
Water in its gaseous state. Water vapor is considered a greenhouse gas because its presence in the Earth's atmosphere contributes to the greenhouse effect.
with additional measures (WAM)
with measures (WEM)
without measures (WOM)
weather
World Climate Report

WMO
World Meteorological Organization

== Y ==
Younger Dryas
A period of rapid and severe climate changes which occurred circa 12,900 to 11,700 years before present.

== See also ==
- Index of climate change articles
- Glossary of environmental science
- Glossary of meteorology
- Scientific consensus on climate change
- Timeline of environmental history
