= Carbon Disclosure Project =

International non-profit organisation

CDP
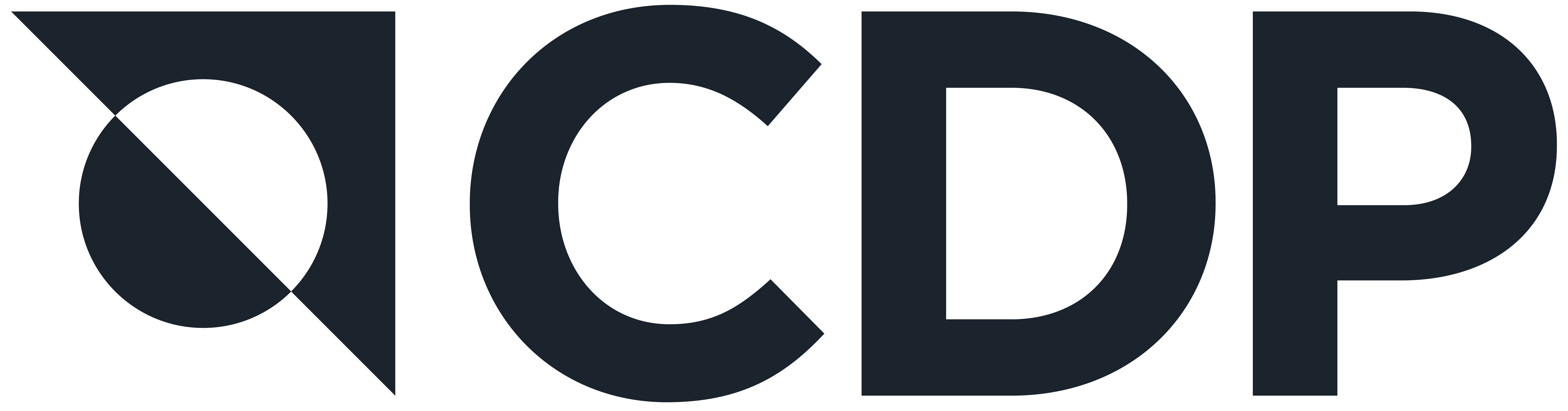
- Founded: 2000
- Key people: Sherry Madera, CEO
- Revenue: 19,200,000 pound sterling (2020)
- Number of employees: 541 (2024)
- Website: www.cdp.net

CDP (formerly the Carbon Disclosure Project) is an international non-profit organisation based in the United Kingdom, Japan, China, Germany, Brazil and the United States that helps companies, cities, states, regions and public authorities disclose their environmental impact. It aims to make environmental reporting and risk management a business norm, driving disclosure, insight, and action towards a sustainable economy. In 2024, nearly 25,000 organisations disclosed their environmental information through CDP.

== Background ==
CDP piggybacked on the Global Reporting Initiative's concept of environmental disclosure in 2002, focusing on individual companies rather than on nations. At the time CDP had just 35 investors signing its request for climate information and 245 companies responding. According to the organisation, as of 2024, companies worth two thirds of global market capitalisation disclose through CDP.

== Mechanism ==
CDP works with corporations, cities, states, and regions to help develop carbon emissions reductions strategies. The collection of self-reported data from the companies is supported by over 800 institutional investors with about US$100 trillion in assets.

== CDP's programs ==
=== Climate change ===
CDP's climate change program aims to reduce companies' greenhouse gas emissions and mitigate climate change risk. CDP requests information on climate risks and low carbon opportunities from the world's largest companies on behalf of over 800 institutional investor signatories with a combined US$100 trillion in assets.

=== Water ===
The program motivates companies to disclose and reduce their environmental impacts by using the power of investors and companies.

=== Supply chain ===
In 2016, some 90 organizations, representing over US$2.5 trillion of purchasing power, requested that their suppliers disclose information on how they are approaching climate and water risks and opportunities. Data was gathered from over 4,000 suppliers worldwide, who reported over US$12 billion worth of savings from emission reduction activities.

=== Forests ===
CDP's forests program has over 290 signatory investors in its network, which collectively represent about US$19 trillion in combined assets. CDP collects information about the four agricultural commodities responsible for most deforestation: timber, palm oil, cattle and soy. CDP's forests program was first set up by the UK Government's Department for International Development via the Global Canopy Programme and the JMG Foundation.

=== Cities ===
With more than 56% of the world's population living in cities today, tracking greenhouse gas emissions is valuable for the reductions of said emissions. CDP Cities provides a platform for cities to measure, manage and disclose their environmental data. More than 500 cities currently measure and disclose environmental data annually via the platform of CDP Cities, based upon a simple questionnaire that allows city governments to disclose their greenhouse gas emission data publicly.

=== Carbon Action initiative ===
Carbon Action is an investor-led initiative which shows how companies in investment portfol are managing carbon emissions and energy efficiency.

Over 300 investors with US$25 trillion in assets under management ask the world's highest emitting companies to take three specific actions in response to climate change:

- Make emissions reductions (year-on-year)
- Publicly disclose emission reduction targets
- Make ROI-positive investments in projects

CDP launched a new research series at the beginning of 2015, taking a sector by sector approach.

== Leadership indices ==
CDP recognizes companies with high-quality disclosure in its annual scoring process, with top companies making it onto CDP's so-called A-list.

Scores are calculated according to a standardized method which measures whether and how well a company responds to each question. A company goes through four main steps, starting with disclosure of their current position, moving to awareness which looks at whether a company is conscious of its environmental impact, to management, and finally leadership.

A high CDP score is supposed to be indicative of a company's environmental awareness, advanced sustainability governance and leadership to address climate change.

== Organisational structure and governance ==
CDP includes three separate legal entities registered in the United Kingdom, Belgium and the United States of America. In the United Kingdom, CDP Worldwide is a charity registered with the Charity Commission for England and Wales. CDP Europe is a registered charity in Brussels, Belgium and Berlin, Germany. CDP North America, Inc is an independent 501(c)(3) entity based in New York City. The three entities have independent trustee boards.

== Funding ==
CDP's funding comes from a combination of government and philanthropic grants (44.4%) and a mixture of membership fees, administrative fees, sponsorships and data licensing. In Europe, CDP is around 30% funded by the LIFE programme of the European Commission.

== Relevance of CDP ==
Proponents claim that disclosures are helpful for investors, corporations, and regulators in making informed decisions on taking action towards a sustainable economy by measuring and understanding their environmental impact and taking steps to address and limit their risk to climate change, deforestation and water security.

=== Studies on CDP ===
- Kolk, Ans; Levy, David; Pinkse, Jonatan (2008). "Corporate Responses in an Emerging Climate Regime: The Institutionalization and Commensuration of Carbon Disclosure". European Accounting Review. 17 (4): 719–745. doi:10.1080/09638180802489121. S2CID 141216.
- Reid, Erin M.; Toffel, Michael W. (2009). "Responding to public and private politics: Corporate disclosure of climate change strategies" (PDF). Strategic Management Journal. 30 (11): 1157–1178. doi:10.1002/smj.796.
- Harmes, Adam (2011). "The Limits of Carbon Disclosure: Theorizing the Business Case for Investor Environmentalism". Global Environmental Politics. 11 (2): 98–119. doi:10.1162/GLEP_a_00057. S2CID 57563666.
- Matisoff, Daniel C.; Noonan, Douglas S.; O'Brien, John J. (2013). "Convergence in Environmental Reporting: Assessing the Carbon Disclosure Project". Business Strategy and the Environment. 22 (5): 285–305. doi:10.1002/bse.1741. hdl:1805/3573.
- Kim, Eun-Hee; Lyon, Thomas (2011). "When Does Institutional Investor Activism Increase Shareholder Value?: The Carbon Disclosure Project". The B.E. Journal of Economic Analysis & Policy. 11. doi:10.2202/1935-1682.2676. S2CID 38627844.
- Lewis, Ben W.; Walls, Judith L.; Dowell, Glen W. S. (2014). "Difference in degrees: CEO characteristics and firm environmental disclosure". Strategic Management Journal. 35 (5): 712–722. doi:10.1002/smj.2127. hdl:10220/19590.
- Matsumura, Ella Mae; Prakash, Rachna; Vera-Muñoz, Sandra C. (2014). "Firm-Value Effects of Carbon Emissions and Carbon Disclosures". The Accounting Review. 89 (2): 695–724. doi:10.2308/accr-50629.
- Saka, Chika; Oshika, Tomoki (2014). "Disclosure effects, carbon emissions and corporate value". Sustainability Accounting, Management and Policy Journal. 5: 22–45. doi:10.1108/SAMPJ-09-2012-0030.
- Gasbarro, Federica; Rizzi, Francesco; Frey, Marco (2016). "Adaptation Measures of Energy and Utility Companies to Cope with Water Scarcity Induced by Climate Change". Business Strategy and the Environment. 25: 54–72. doi:10.1002/bse.1857.
- Doda, Baran; Gennaioli, Caterina; Gouldson, Andy; Grover, David; Sullivan, Rory (2016). "Are Corporate Carbon Management Practices Reducing Corporate Carbon Emissions?" (PDF). Corporate Social Responsibility and Environmental Management. 23 (5): 257–270. doi:10.1002/csr.1369.
- Misani, Nicola; Pogutz, Stefano (2015). "Unraveling the effects of environmental outcomes and processes on financial performance: A non-linear approach" (PDF). Ecological Economics. 109: 150–160. doi:10.1016/j.ecolecon.2014.11.010. S2CID 31107426.
- Kumar, Praveen; Firoz, Mohammad (2018). "Impact of Climate Change Disclosure on Financial Performance: An Analysis of Indian Firms". Journal of Environmental Accounting and Management. 6 (3): 185–197. doi:10.5890/JEAM.2018.09.001. S2CID 170035443.
- Kumar, Praveen; Firoz, Mohammad (2018). "Impact of carbon emissions on cost of debt-evidence from India". Managerial Finance. 44 (12): 1401–1417. doi:10.1108/MF-03-2018-0108. S2CID 158735930.
- Kumar, Praveen; Firoz, Mohammad (2019). "What Drives the Voluntary Environmental Reporting (VER): An Examination of CDP India Firms". Journal of Environmental Accounting and Management. 7: 47–59. doi:10.5890/JEAM.2019.03.004. S2CID 243686556.
- Kumar, Praveen; Mittal, Amit; Firoz, Mohammad (2020). "Carbon credit issuance: accounting based financial performance". SCMS Journal of Indian Management. 17(2): 111–119.
- Charumathi, B.; Rahman, Habeebu (2019). "Do Women on Boards Influence Climate Change Disclosures to CDP? – Evidence from Large Indian Companies". Australasian Accounting, Business and Finance Journal. 13 (2): 5–31. doi:10.14453/aabfj.v13i2.2.

=== Corporate recognition of CDP ===
In 2010, CDP was called "The most powerful green NGO you've never heard of" by the Harvard Business Review. In 2012 it won the Zayed Future Energy Prize.

== See also ==
- Carbon accounting
- Carbon footprint
- Global warming
- Greenhouse debt
- Science Based Targets initiative
