= Stephen Gardiner (disambiguation) =

Stephen Gardiner (1483–1555) was an English Catholic bishop.

Stephen or Steven Gardiner may also refer to:

- Stephen Gardiner (architect) (1924–2007), British architect, teacher and writer
- Steven Gardiner (born 1995), Bahamian track and field sprinter
- Stephen M. Gardiner (born 1967), American philosopher

== See also ==
- Stephen Gardner (1921–1978), American businessman and vice chairman of the Federal Reserve
- Stephen Gardner Champlin (1827–1864), American physician, lawyer, soldier, and judge
