= Glossary of environmental science =

This is a glossary of environmental science.

Environmental science is the study of interactions among physical, chemical, and biological components of the environment. Environmental science provides an integrated, quantitative, and interdisciplinary approach to the study of environmental systems.

== 0-9 ==
- 1-in-100 flood – a flood with 1 in 100 chance of occurring in any given year (used as a safety requirement for the construction industry.)
- 20/30/10 standard - 20 mg/L Biochemical Oxygen Demand (BOD), 30 mg/L Suspended Solids (SS), 10 units of E. coli: the water quality standard for greywater use in toilets, laundry and surface irrigation.
- 5Rs - (sustainability) reduce, remanufacture, reuse, recycle, recover.

== A ==
- abiotic component - Any non-living chemical or physical part of the environment that affects living organisms and the functioning of ecosystems, such as the atmosphere and water resources. (see also biotic).
- absorption pit (soakaway) – a hole dug in permeable ground and filled with broken stones or granular material and usually covered with earth allowing collected water to soak into the ground.
- absorption - one substance taking in another, either physically or chemically.
- acclimation - the process of an organism adjusting to chronic change in its environment.
- acid mine drainage - the outflow of acidic water from metal mines or coal mines.
- acid rain - rain or other forms of precipitation that is unusually acidic.
- adaptation - a characteristic of an organism that has been favoured by natural selection.
- adaptive radiation - closely related species that look very different, as a result of having adapted to widely different ecological niches.
- additionality - (of biodiversity offsets) where the conservation outcomes delivered by a biodiversity offset are demonstrably new and would not have resulted without the offset.
- adsorption - one substance taking up another at its surface.
- aerobic - requiring air or oxygen; used in reference to decomposition processes that occur in the presence of oxygen.
- aerosols - solid or liquid particles suspended within the atmosphere.
- affluenza - as defined in the book of the same name 1. the bloated, sluggish and unfulfilled feeling that results from efforts to keep up with the Joneses. 2. an epidemic of stress, overwork, waste and indebtedness caused by dogged pursuit of the Australian dream. 3. an unsustainable addiction to economic growth. The traditional Western environmentally unfriendly high consumption life-style: a play on the words affluence and influenza cf. froogle, freegan.
- afforestation - planting new forests on lands that have not been recently forested.
- agroforestry - (sustainability) an ecologically based farming system, that, through the integration of trees in farms, increases social, environmental and economic benefits to land users.
- air pollution - the modification of the natural characteristics of the atmosphere by a chemical, particulate matter, or biological agent.
- albedo - reflectance; the ratio of light from the Sun that is reflected by the Earth's surface, to the light received by it. Unreflected light is converted to infrared radiation (heat), which causes atmospheric warming (see "radiative forcing"). Thus, surfaces with a high albedo, like snow and ice, generally contribute to cooling, whereas surfaces with a low albedo, like forests, generally contribute to warming. Changes in land use that significantly alter the characteristics of land surfaces can alter the albedo.
- algal bloom - the rapid and excessive growth of algae; generally caused by high nutrient levels combined with other favourable conditions. Blooms can deoxygenate the water leading to the loss of wildlife.
- alien species - see introduced species.
- alloy - composite blend of materials made under special conditions. Metal alloys like brass and bronze are well known but there are also many plastic alloys.
- alternative fuels - fuels like ethanol and compressed natural gas that produce fewer emissions than the traditional fossil fuels.
- anaerobic digestion - the biological degradation of organic materials in the absence of oxygen to yield methane gas (that may be combusted to produce energy) and stabilised organic residues (that may be used as a soil additive).
- anaerobic - not requiring air or oxygen; used in reference to decomposition processes that occur in the absence of oxygen.
- ancient forest - see old growth forest.
- anoxic - with abnormally low levels of oxygen.
- anthropogenic - man-made, not natural.
- anthroposophy - spiritual philosophy based on the teachings of Rudolf Steiner (25 February 1861 – 30 March 1925) which postulates the existence of an objective, intellectually comprehensible spiritual world accessible to direct experience through inner development - more specifically through cultivating conscientiously a form of thinking independent of sensory experience. Steiner was the initiator of biodynamic gardening.
- application efficiency - (sustainability) the efficiency of watering after losses due to runoff, leaching, evaporation, wind etc.
- appropriated carrying capacity - another name for the Ecological Footprint, but often used in referring to the imported ecological capacity of goods from overseas.
- aquaculture - the cultivation of aquatic organisms under controlled conditions.
- aquifer – a bed or layer yielding water for wells and springs etc.; an underground geological formation capable of receiving, storing and transmitting large quantities of water. Aquifer types include: confined (sealed and possibly containing “fossil” water); unconfined (capable of receiving inflow); and Artesian (an aquifer in which the hydraulic pressure will cause the water to rise above the upper confining layer).
- arable land - land that can be used for growing crops.
- atmosphere – general name for the layer of gases around a material body; the Earth's atmosphere consists, from the ground up, of the troposphere (which includes the planetary boundary layer or peplosphere, the lowest layer), stratosphere, mesosphere, ionosphere (or thermosphere), exosphere and magnetosphere.
- autotroph - an organism that produces complex organic compounds from simple inorganic molecules using energy from light or inorganic chemical reactions.
- available water capacity – that proportion of soil water that can be readily absorbed by plant roots.
- avoidance – (sustainability) the first step in the waste hierarchy where waste generation is prevented (avoided).

== B ==
- backflow - movement of water back to source e.g. contaminated water in a plumbing system.
- baffle - (landscape design) an obstruction to trap debris in drainage water.
- bagasse - the fibrous residue of sugar cane milling used as a fuel to produce steam in sugar mills.
- baseload - the steady and reliable supply of energy through the grid. This is punctuated by bursts of higher demand known as “peak-load”. Supply companies must be able to respond instantly to extreme variation in demand and supply, especially during extreme conditions. Gas generators can react quickly while coal is slow but provides the steady "baseload". Renewable energies are generally not available on demand in this way.
- batters - (landscape design) the slope of earthworks such as drainage channels.
- best practice - a process, or innovative use of technology, equipment or resources or other measurable factors that have a proven record of success.
- bioaccumulation - the accumulation of a substance, such as a toxic chemical, in the tissues of a living organism.
- biocapacity - a measure of the biological productivity of an area. This may depend on natural conditions or human inputs like farming and forestry practices; the area needed to support the consumption of a defined population.
- biocoenosis (alternatively, biocoenose or biocenose ) – all the interacting organisms living together in a specific habitat (or biotope).
- biodegradable - capable of being decomposed through the action of organisms, especially bacteria.
- biodiversity - the variety of life in all its forms, levels and combinations; includes ecosystem diversity, species diversity, and genetic diversity.
- biodiversity banking - a market system for biodiversity offsetting that turns offsets into assets that can be traded.
- biodiversity credit - a certificate that represents a measured and evidence-based unit of positive biodiversity outcome that is durable and additional to what would otherwise have occurred.
- biodiversity offset - measurable conservation outcomes that result from actions designed to compensate for significant residual impacts on biodiversity, arising from a project and persisting after appropriate avoidance, minimization and restoration measures have been taken. The goal of biodiversity offsets is to achieve "no net loss" while adhering to a "like- for-like" principle, where offsets conserve the same biodiversity values that a project impacts.
- bioelement - an element required by a living organism.
- bioenergy - used in different senses: in its most narrow sense it is a synonym for biofuel, fuel derived from biological sources. In its broader sense it encompasses also biomass, the biological material used as a biofuel, as well as the social, economic, scientific and technical fields associated with using biological sources for energy.
- biofuel - the fuel produced by the chemical and/or biological processing of biomass. Biofuel will either be a solid (e.g. charcoal), liquid (e.g. ethanol) or gas (e.g. methane).
- biogas - landfill gas and sewage gas, also called biomass gas.
- biogeochemical cycle - a circuit or pathway by which a chemical element or molecule moves through both biotic ("bio-") and abiotic ("geo-") parts of an ecosystem.
- biogeochemical cycles - the movement of chemical elements between organisms and non-living components of the atmosphere, aquatic systems and soils.
- biological oxygen demand (BOD) - a chemical procedure for determining how fast biological organisms use up oxygen in a body of water.
- biological pest control - a method of controlling pests (including insects, mites, weeds and plant diseases) that relies on predation, parasitism, herbivory, or other natural mechanisms.
- biological productivity - (bioproductivity) the capacity of a given area to produce biomass; different ecosystems (i.e. pasture, forest, etc.) will have different levels of bioproductivity. Biological productivity is determined by dividing the total biological production (how much is grown and living) by the total area available.
- biologically productive land - is land that is fertile enough to support forests, agriculture and / or animal life. All of the biologically productive land of a country comprises its biological capacity. Arable land is typically the most productive area.
- biomass - the materials derived from photosynthesis (fossilised materials may or may not be included) such as forest, agricultural crops, wood and wood wastes, animal wastes, livestock operation residues, aquatic plants, and municipal and industrial wastes; the quantity of organic material present in unit area at a particular time mostly expressed as tons of dry matter per unit area; organic matter that can be used as fuel.
- biome - a climatic and geographically defined area of ecologically similar communities of plants, animals, and soil organisms, often referred to as ecosystems.
- biophysical - the living and non-living components and processes of the ecosphere. Biophysical measurements of nature quantify the ecosphere in physical units such as cubic metres, kilograms or joules.
- bioregion - (ecoregion) an area comprising a natural ecological community and bounded by natural borders.
- bioremediation - a process using organisms to remove or neutralise contaminants (e.g. petrol), mostly in soil or water.
- biosolids - nutrient-rich organic materials derived from wastewater solids (sewage sludge) that have been stabilised through processing.
- biosphere - the part of the Earth, including air, land, surface rocks, and water, within which life occurs, and which biotic processes in turn alter or transform.
- biosphere - the zone of air, land and water at the surface of the earth that is occupied by living organisms; the combination of all ecosystems on Earth and maintained by the energy of the Sun; the interface between the hydrosphere, geosphere and atmosphere.
- biotic potential - the maximum reproductive capacity of a population under optimum environmental conditions.
- biotic - relating to, produced by, or caused by living organisms. (see also abiotic).
- birth rate - number of people born as a percentage of the total population in any given period of time; number of live births per 1000 people.
- blackwater - household wastewater that contains solid waste i.e. toilet discharge.
- bluewater - collectible water from rainfall; the water that falls on roofs and hard surfaces usually flowing into rivers and the sea and recharging the ground water. In nature the global average proportion of total rainfall that is blue water is about 40%. Blue water productivity in the garden can be increased by improving irrigation techniques, soil water storage, moderating the climate, using garden design and water-conserving plantings; also safe use of grey water.
- boreal - northern; cold temperate Northern Hemisphere forests that grow where there is a mean annual temperature < 0 °C.
- broad-acre farm - commercial farm covering a large area; usually a mixed farm in dryland conditions.
- brownfield - a term often used to describe land previously used for industrial or commercial purposes with known or suspected pollution including soil contamination due to hazardous waste.
- Brundtland Commission Report - a UN report, Our Common Future, published in 1987 and dealing with sustainable development and the policies required to achieve it, which the report characterizes as "development that meets the needs of the present without compromising the ability of future generations to meet their own needs."

== C ==
- C3 & C4 plants – C4 plants comprise about 5% of all plants, are most abundant in hot and arid conditions, and include crops like sugar cane and soybeans. During photosynthesis they form molecules with 4-carbon atoms and saturate at the given level of CO_{2}. C3 plants, the other 95%, photosynthesise to form 3 carbon molecules and increase photosynthesis with as CO_{2} levels increase.
- calorie – a basic measure of energy that has been replaced by the SI unit the joule; in physics it approximates the energy needed to increase the temperature of 1 gram of water by 1 °C which is about 4.184 joules. The Calories in food ratings (spelled with a capital C) and nutrition are ‘big C’ Calories or kcal.
- calorific value – the energy content of a fuel measured as the heat released on complete combustion.
- cancer – a group of diseases in which cells are aggressive (grow and divide without respect to normal limits), invasive (invade and destroy adjacent tissues), and sometimes metastatic (spread to other locations in the body).
- capillary action (wicking) – water drawn through a medium by surface tension.
- car pooling – giving people lifts to help reduce emissions and traffic.
- carbon budget – a measure of carbon inputs and outputs for a particular activity.
- carbon credit – a market-driven way of reducing the impact of greenhouse gas emissions; it allows an agent to benefit financially from an emission reduction. There are two forms of carbon credit, those that are part of national and international trade and those that are purchased by individuals. Internationally, to achieve Kyoto Protocol objectives, ‘caps’ (limits) on participating country's emissions are established. To meet these limits countries, in turn, set ‘caps’ (allowances or credits: 1 convertible and transferable credit = 1 tonne of CO_{2}-e emissions) for operators. Operators that meet the agreed ‘caps’ can then sell unused credits to operators who exceed ‘caps’. Operators can then choose the most cost-effective way of reducing emissions. Individual carbon credits would operate in a similar way cf. carbon offset.
- carbon cycle – the biogeochemical cycle by which carbon is exchanged between the biosphere, geosphere, hydrosphere, and atmosphere of the Earth.
- Carbon Dioxide Equivalent (CO_{2}e ) – the unit used to measure the impacts of releasing (or avoiding the release of) the seven different greenhouse gases; it is obtained by multiplying the mass of the greenhouse gas by its global warming potential. For example, this would be 21 for methane and 310 for nitrous oxide.
- carbon dioxide – a gas with the chemical formula CO_{2}; the most abundant greenhouse gas emitted from fossil fuels.
- carbon equivalent (C-e) – obtained by multiplying the CO_{2}-e by the factor 12/44.
- carbon footprint – a measure of the carbon emissions that are emitted over the full life cycle of a product or service and usually expressed as grams of CO_{2}-e.
- carbon labelling – use of product labels that display greenhouse emissions associated with goods (www.carbontrustcertification.com for product carbon footprint methodology).
- carbon neutral – activities where net carbon inputs and outputs are the same. For example, assuming a constant amount of vegetation on the planet, burning wood will add carbon to the atmosphere in the short term but this carbon will cycle back into new plant growth.
- carbon pool – a storage reservoir of carbon.
- carbon sink – any carbon storage system that causes a net removal of greenhouse gases from the atmosphere.
- carbon source – opposite of carbon sink; a net source of carbon for the atmosphere.
- carbon stocks – the quantity of carbon held within a carbon pool at a specified time.
- carbon taxes – a surcharge on fossil fuels that aims to reduce carbon dioxide emissions.
- carcinogen – a substance, radionuclide or radiation that is an agent directly involved in the promotion of cancer or in the facilitation of its propagation.
- carrying capacity – the maximum population that an ecosystem can sustain cf. biocapacity.
- catchment area – the area that is the source of water for a water supply whether a dam or rainwater tank.
- cell – (biology) the structural and functional unit of all known living organisms and is the smallest unit of an organism that is classified as living
- CFC – chlorofluorocarbon. CFCs are potent greenhouse gases which are not regulated by the Kyoto Protocol since they are covered by the Montreal Protocol.
- chlorinated hydrocarbon – see organochloride
- chlorofluorocarbons – one of the more widely known family of haloalkanes.
- circular metabolism – a system in which wastes, especially water and materials, are reused and recycled cf. linear metabolism.
- Class A pan – (water management) an open pan used as a standard for measuring water evaporation.
- cleaner production – the continual effort to prevent pollution, reduce the use of energy, water and material resources and minimise waste – all without reducing production capacity.
- clearcutting – a forestry or logging practice in which most or all trees in a forest sector are felled.
- climate change – a change in weather over time and/or region; usually relating to changes in temperature, wind patterns and rainfall; although may be natural or anthropogenic, common discourse carries the assumption that recent climate change is anthropogenic.
- climate – the general variations of weather in a region over long periods of time; the "average weather" cf. weather.
- cogeneration – the simultaneous production of electricity and useful heat from the combustion of the same fuel source.
- cohousing – clusters of houses having shared dining halls and other spaces, encouraging stronger social ties while reducing the material and energy needs of the community.
- coir – fibre of the coconut.
- commercial and industrial waste – (waste management) solid waste generated by the business sector as well as that created by State and Federal government, schools and tertiary institutions. Does not include that from the construction and demolition industry.
- commingled materials – (waste management) materials mixed together, such as plastic bottles, glass, and metal containers. Commingled recyclable materials require sorting after collection before they can be recycled.
- comparative risk assessment – a methodology which uses science, policy, economic analysis and stakeholder participation to identify and address areas of greatest environmental risk; a method for assessing environmental management priorities. The US EPA (www.epa.gov/seahome/comprisk.html) offers free software which contains the history and methodology of comparative risk, as well as many case studies.
- compensation point – the point where the amount of energy produced by photosynthesis equals the amount of energy released by respiration.
- Complex system is a system composed of many components which may interact with each other.
- compost – the aerobically decomposed remnants of organic matter.
- composting – the biological decomposition of organic materials in the presence of oxygen that yields carbon dioxide, heat, and stabilised organic residues that may be used as a soil additive.
- confined aquifer – aquifers that have the water table above their upper boundary and are typically found below unconfined aquifers.
- conspicuous consumption – the lavish spending on goods and services that are acquired mainly for the purpose of displaying income or wealth rather than to satisfy basic needs of the consumer.
- construction and demolition waste – (waste management) includes waste from residential, civil, and commercial construction and demolition activities, such as fill material (e.g. soil), asphalt, bricks and timber. C&D waste excludes construction waste which is included in the municipal waste stream. C&D waste does not generally include waste from the commercial and industrial waste stream.
- consumer democracy – using your economic capacity to promote your values.
- consumer – organism, human being, or industry that maintains itself by transforming a high-quality energy source into a lower one cf. Producer, primary production.
- consumption (ecology) – the use of resources by a living system, the inflow and degradation of energy that is used for system activity.
- consumption (economics) – part of disposable income (income after taxes paid and payments received) that is not saved, essentially the goods and services used by households; this includes purchased commodities at the household level (such as food, clothing, and utilities), the goods and services paid for by government (such as defence, education, social services and health care), and the resources consumed by businesses to increase their assets (such as business equipment and housing).
- contour ploughing (contour farming) – the farming practice of plowing across a slope following its contours. The rows formed have the effect of slowing water run-off during rainstorms so that the soil is not washed away and allows the water to percolate into the soil.
- controlled burning – a technique sometimes used in forest management, farming, prairie restoration or greenhouse gas abatement.
- Convention on the International Trade in Endangered Species (CITES) – International agreement among 167 governments aiming to ensure that cross-border trade in wild animals and plants does not threaten their survival. The species covered by CITES are listed in three Appendices, according to the degree of protection they need (see: http://www.cites.org)
- Corporate Social Responsibility – integration of social and environmental policies into day-to-day corporate business.
- covenants – formal agreements or contracts, often between government and industry sectors. The national packaging covenant and sustainability covenants are examples of voluntary covenants with a regulatory underpinning. Land covenants protect land for wildlife into the future.
- critical load – a concept in pollution studies hypothesizing that there exist quantitative thresholds for one or more pollutants above which significant detrimental effects on ecological systems (e.g. the eutrophication of natural waterways) will occur, and/or conversely below which they are not known to occur.
- crop coefficient (Kc) – (water management) a variable used to calculate the evapotranspiration of a plant crop based on that of a reference crop.
- crop evapotranspiration (ETc) – (water management) is the crop water use – the daily water withdrawal.
- crop rotation (crop sequencing) – the practice of growing a series of dissimilar types of crops in the same space in sequential seasons for various benefits such as to avoid the buildup of pathogens and pests that often occurs when one species is continuously cropped.
- crude oil – naturally occurring mixture of hydrocarbons under normal temperature and pressure.
- cullet – crushed glass that is suitable for recycling by glass manufacturers.
- cultural eutrophication - the process that speeds up natural eutrophication because of human activity.
- cultural services – the non-material benefits of ecosystems including refreshment, spiritual enrichment, knowledge, artistic satisfaction.
- culture jamming – altering existing mass media to criticise itself (e.g. defacing advertisements with an alternative message). Public activism opposing commercialism as little more than propaganda for established interests, and the attempt to find alternative expression.
- culvert – drain that passes under a road or pathway, may be a pipe or other conduit.
- cut and fill – removing earth from one place to another, usually mechanically.
- cyanobacteria (Cyanophyta or blue-green algae) – a phylum of bacteria that obtain their energy through photosynthesis.
- cyclone – intense low pressure weather systems; mid-latitude cyclones are atmospheric circulations that rotate clockwise in the Southern Hemisphere and anti-clockwise in the Northern Hemisphere and are generally associated with stronger winds, unsettled conditions, cloudiness and rainfall. Tropical cyclones (which are called hurricanes in the Northern Hemisphere) cause storm surges in coastal areas.

== D ==
- DDT - a chlorinated hydrocarbon used as a pesticide that is a persistent organic pollutant.
- debt-for-Nature Swap - a financial transaction in which a portion of a developing nation's foreign debt is forgiven in exchange for local investments in conservation measures.
- decomposers – consumers, mostly microbial, that change dead organic matter into minerals and heat.
- deforestation - the conversion of forested areas to non-forest land for agriculture, urban use, development, or wasteland.
- dematerialisation – decreasing the consumption of materials and resources while maintaining quality of life.
- desalination producing potable or recyclable water by removing salts from salty or brackish water. This is done by three methods: distillation/freezing; reverse osmosis using membranes and electrodialysis; ion exchange. At present, all these methods are energy intensive.
- desert – an area that receives an average annual precipitation of less than 250 mm (9.8 in) or an area in which more water is lost than falls as precipitation.
- desertification - the degradation of land in arid, semi arid and dry sub-humid areas resulting from various climatic variations, but primarily from human activities.
- detritivore (detritus feeder) - animals and plants that consume detritus (decomposing organic material), and in doing so contribute to decomposition and the recycling of nutrients.
- detritus - non-living particulate organic material (as opposed to dissolved organic material).
- developing countries – development of a country is measured using a mix of economic factors (income per capita, GDP, degree of modern infrastructure (both physical and institutional), degree of industrialisation, proportion of economy devoted to agriculture and natural resource extraction) and social factors (life expectancy, the rate of literacy, poverty). The UN-produced Human Development Index (HDI) is a compound indicator of the above statistics. There is a strong correlation between low income and high population growth, both within and between countries. In developing countries, there is low per capita income, widespread poverty, and low capital formation. In developed countries there is continuous economic growth and a relatively high standard of living. The term is value-laden and prescriptive, as it implies a natural transition from "undeveloped" to "developed" when such transitions can instead be imposed. Although poverty and physical deprivation are clearly undesirable, it does not follow that it is therefore desirable for "undeveloped" economies to move towards affluent Western-style "developed" free market economies. The terms "industrialised" and "non-industrialised" are no different in this assumption.
- dfE – design for the environment; dfE considers 'cradle to grave' costs and benefits associated with material acquisition, manufacture, use, and disposal.
- dfM – design for manufacturing; designing products in such a way that they are easy to manufacture.
- dfS – design for sustainability; an integrated design approach aiming to achieve both environmental quality and economic efficiency through the redesign of industrial systems.
- dfX – design for assembly/disassembly, re-use. recycle.
- dieback – (arboriculture) a condition in trees or woody plants in which peripheral parts are killed, either by parasites or due to conditions such as acid rain.
- dietary energy supply – food available for human consumption, usually expressed in kilocalories per person per day.
- dioxin - any one of a number of chemical compounds that are persistent organic pollutants and are carcinogenic.
- distributed water – (water management) purchased water supplied to a user; this is usually through a reticulated mains system (but also through pipes and open channels, irrigation systems supplied to farms).
- diversion rate – (waste disposal) the proportion of a potentially recyclable material that has been diverted out of the waste disposal stream and therefore not directed to landfill.
- divertible resource – (water management) the proportion of water runoff and recharge that can be accessed for human use.
- downcycling – (waste management) recycling in which the quality of an item is diminished with each recycling.
- downstream – those processes occurring after a particular activity e.g. the transport of a manufactured product from a factory to the wholesale or retail outlet cf. upstream.
- drainage – (water management) that part of irrigation or rainfall that runs off an area or is lost to deep percolation.
- drawdown – (water management) drop in water level, generally applied to wells or bores.
- dredging - (water management) the repositioning of soil from an aquatic environment, using specialized equipment, in order to initiate infrastructural and/or ecological improvements.
- drift net - a type of fishing net used in oceans, coastal seas and freshwater lakes.
- drinking water – (potable water) – water fit for human consumption in accordance with World Health Organisation guidelines.
- drip irrigation – (water management) a drip hose placed near the plant roots so minimising deep percolation and evaporation.
- driver – (ecology) any natural or human-induced factor that directly or indirectly causes a change in an ecosystem. A direct driver is one that unequivocally influences ecosystem processes and that can be measured.
- drop-off centre – (waste management) a location where discarded materials can be left for recycling.
- drought – an acute water shortage relative to availability, supply and demand in a particular region. An extended period of months or years when a region notes a deficiency in its water supply. Generally, this occurs when a region receives consistently below average precipitation.
- dryland salinity - (water management) accumulation of salts in soils, soil water and ground water; may be natural or induced by land clearing

== E ==
- eco- - a prefix now added to many words indicating a general consideration for the environment e.g. ecohousing, ecolabel, ecomaterial.
- eco-asset – a biological asset that provides financial value to private land owners when they are maintained in or restored to their natural state.
- ecolabel - seal or logo indicating a product has met a certain environmental or social standards.
- ecological deficit - of a country or region measures the amount by which its Ecological Footprint exceeds the ecological capacity of that region.
- Ecological Footprint (Eco-footprint, Footprint)– a measure of the area of biologically productive land and water needed to produce the resources and absorb the wastes of a population using the prevailing technology and resource management schemes; a measure of the consumption of renewable natural resources by a human population, be it that of a country, a region or the whole world given as the total area of productive land or sea required to produce all the crops, meat, seafood, wood and fibre it consumes, to sustain its energy consumption and to give space for its infrastructure.
- ecological niche - the habitat of a species or population within its ecosystem.
- ecological succession - the more-or-less predictable and orderly changes in the composition or structure of an ecological community with time.
- ecological sustainability - the capacity of ecosystems to maintain their essential processes and function and to retain their biological diversity without impoverishment.
- ecologically sustainable development - using, conserving and enhancing the human community's resources so that ecological processes, on which all life depends, can be maintained and enriched into the future.
- ecology - the scientific study of living organisms and their relationships to one another and their environment; the scientific study of the processes regulating the distribution and abundance of organisms; the study of the design of ecosystem structure and function.
- externality – a cost or benefit that are not borne by the producer or supplier of a good or service. In many environmental situations environmental deterioration may be caused by a few while the cost is borne by the community; examples would include overfishing, pollution (e.g. production of greenhouse emissions that are not compensated for in any way by taxes etc.), the environmental cost of land-clearing etc.
- ecoregion - (bioregion) the next smallest ecologically and geographically defined area beneath realm (or ecozone).
- ecosystem boundary – the spatial delimitation of an ecosystem usually based on discontinuities of organisms and the physical environment.
- ecosystem services - the role played by organisms, without charge, in creating a healthy environment for human beings, from production of oxygen to soil formation, maintenance of water quality and much more. These services are now generally divided into four groups, supporting, provisioning, regulating and cultural.
- ecosystem - a dynamic complex of plant, animal and microorganism communities and their non-living environment all interacting as a functional unit.
- e-cycling – recycling electronic waste.
- effective rainfall – the volume of rainfall passing into the soil; that part of rainfall available for plant use after runoff, leaching, evaporation and foliage interception.
- energy efficiency - using less energy to provide the same level of energy service.
- effluent - a discharge or emission of liquid, gas or other waste product.
- El Niño - a warm water current which periodically flows southwards along the coast of Ecuador and Peru in South America, replacing the usually cold northwards flowing current; occurs once every five to seven years, usually during the Christmas season (the name refers to the Christ child); the opposite phase of an El Niño is called a La Niña.
- embodied energy - the energy expended over the entire life cycle of a good or service cf. emergy.
- emergent property – a property that is not evident in the individual components of an object or system.
- emergy – “energy memory” all the available energy that was used in the work of making a product directly and indirectly, expressed in units of one type of available energy (work previously done to provide a product or service); the energy of one type required to make energy of another.
- emission standard - a level of emissions that, under law, may not be exceeded.
- emissions intensity – emissions expressed as quantity per monetary unit.
- emissions trading – see carbon trading.
- emissions - substances such as gases or particles discharged into the atmosphere as a result of natural processes of human activities, including those from chimneys, elevated point sources, and tailpipes of motor vehicles.
- endangered species – a species which is at risk of becoming extinct because it is either few in number, or threatened by changing environmental or predation parameters.
- energetics – the study of how energy flows within an ecosystem: the routes it takes, rates of flow, where it is stored and how it is used.
- energy - a property of all systems which can be turned into heat and measured in heat units.

* available energy – energy with the potential to do work (exergy);
* delivered energy – energy delivered to and used by a household, usually gas and electricity;
* direct energy - the energy being currently used, used mostly at home (delivered energy) and for fuels used mainly for transport;
* embodied energy - t the energy expended over the entire life cycle of a good or service OR the energy involved in the extraction of basic materials, processing/manufacture, transport and disposal of a product OR the energy required to provide a good or service;
* geothermal energy – heat emitted from within the Earth's crust as hot water or steam and used to generate electricity after transformation;
* hydro energy – potential and kinetic energy of water used to generate electricity;
* indirect energy – the energy generated in, and accounted for, by the wider economy as a consequence of an agent's actions or demands;
* kinetic energy - the energy possessed by a body because of its motion;
* nuclear energy - energy released by reactions within atomic nuclei, as in nuclear fission or fusion (also called atomic energy);
* operational energy – the energy used in carrying out a particular operation;
* potential energy – the energy possessed by a body as a result of its position or condition e.g. coiled springs and charged batteries have potential energy;
* primary energy – forms of energy obtained directly from nature, the energy in raw fuels (electricity from the grid is not primary energy), used mostly in energy statistics when compiling energy balances;
* solar energy – solar radiation used for hot water production and electricity generation (does not include passive solar energy to heat and cool buildings etc.);
* secondary energy – primary energies are transformed in energy conversion processes to more convenient secondary forms such as electrical energy and cleaner fuels;
* stationary energy – that energy that is other than transport fuels and fugitive emissions, used mostly for production of electricity but also for manufacturing and processing and in agriculture, fisheries etc.;
* tidal/ocean/wave energy– mechanical energy from water movement used to generate electricity;
* useful energy – available energy used to increase system production and efficiency;
* wind energy – kinetic energy of wind used for electricity generation using turbines

- energy accounting – measuring value by the energy input required for a good or service. A form of accounting that builds in a measure of our impact on nature (rather than being restricted to human-based items).
- energy audit - a systematic gathering and analysis of energy use information that can be used to determine energy efficiency improvements. The Australian and New Zealand Standard AS/NZS 3598:2000 Energy Audits defines three levels of audit.
- Energy Footprint - the area required to provide or absorb the waste from coal, oil, gas, fuelwood, nuclear energy and hydropower: the Fossil Fuel Footprint is the area required to sequester the emitted CO_{2} taking into account CO_{2} absorption by the sea etc.
- energy management - A program of well-planned actions aimed at reducing energy use, recurrent energy costs, and detrimental greenhouse gas emissions.
- energy recovery – the productive extraction of energy, usually electricity or heat, from waste or materials that would otherwise have gone to landfill.
- energy-for-land ratio - the amount of energy that can be produced per hectare of ecologically productive land. The units used are gigajoules per hectare and year, or GJ/ha/yr. For fossil fuel (calculated as CO_{2} assimilation) the ratio is 100 GJ/ha/yr.
- enhanced greenhouse effect - the increase in the natural greenhouse effect resulting from increases in atmospheric concentrations of greenhouse gases due to emissions from human activities.
- ENSO (El Niño–Southern Oscillation) a suite of events that occur at the time of an El Niño; at one extreme of the cycle, when the central Pacific Ocean is warm and the atmospheric pressure over Australia is relatively high, the ENSO causes drought conditions over eastern Australia cf. El Niño, Southern Oscillation.
- environment - the external conditions, resources, stimuli etc. with which an organism interacts.
- Environmental ethics - There are many ethical decisions that human beings make with respect to the environment.
- environmental flows - river or creek water flows that are allocated for the maintenance of the waterway ecosystems.
- environmental indicator - physical, chemical, biological or socio-economic measure that can be used to assess natural resources and environmental quality.
- environmental impact assessment (EIA) - the assessment of the environmental consequences of a plan, policy, program, or actual projects prior to the decision to move forward with the proposed action.
- environmental movement (environmentalism) - both the conservation and green movements; a diverse scientific, social, and political movement. In general terms, environmentalists advocate the sustainable management of resources and stewardship of the natural environment through changes in public policy and individual behavior. In its recognition of humanity as a participant in ecosystems, the movement is centered around ecology, health, and human rights.
- environmental science - the study of interactions among physical, chemical, and biological components of the environment.
- epidemiology - the study of factors affecting the health and illness of populations, and serves as the foundation and logic of interventions made in the interest of public health and preventive medicine.
- erosion - displacement of solids (sediment, soil, rock and other particles) usually by the agents of currents such as, wind, water, or ice by downward or down-slope movement in response to gravity or by living organisms.
- Escherichia coli (E. coli) – a bacterium used as an indicator of faecal contamination and potential disease organisms in water.
- estuary - a semi-enclosed coastal body of water with one or more rivers or streams flowing into it, and with a free connection to the open sea.
- ethical consumerism - buying things that are made ethically i.e. without harm to or exploitation of humans, animals or the natural environment. This generally entails favoring products and businesses that take account of the greater good in their operations.
- ethical living – adopting lifestyles, consumption and shopping habits that minimise our negative impact, and maximise our positive impact on people, the environment and the economy cf. consumer democracy, sustainable living.
- eutrophication - the enrichment of waterbodies with nutrients, primarily nitrogen and phosphorus, which stimulates the growth of aquatic organisms.
- eutrophication - an increase in chemical nutrients, typically compounds containing nitrogen or phosphorus, in an ecosystem.
- euxenic - with extremely low oxygen cf. anoxic.
- evaporation – water converted to water vapour.
- evapotranspiration (ET) – the water evaporating from the soil and transpired by plants.
- e-waste - electronic waste, especially mobile phones, televisions and personal computers.
- extended producer responsibility (EPR) (product take-back) - a requirement (often in law) that producers take back and accept responsibility for the responsible disposal of their products; this encourages the design of products that can be easily repaired, recycled, reused or upgraded.
- external water footprint – the embodied water of imported goods cf. internal water footprint.
- externality – (environmental economics) by-products of activities that affect the well-being of people or damage the environment, where those impacts are not reflected in market prices. The costs (or benefits) associated with externalities do not enter standard cost accounting schemes. The environment is often cited as a negatively affected externality of the economy (see economic externality).
- extinction event - (mass extinction, extinction-level event, ELE) - a sharp decrease in the number of species in a relatively short period of time.
- extinction - the cessation of existence of a species or group of taxa, reducing biodiversity.
- Extreme points of Earth - the geographical locations that differ relative to other locations on the landmasses, continents or countries.

== F ==
- feedback – flow from the products of an action back to interact with the action.
- feedlot (feedyard) - a type of Confined Animal Feeding Operation (CAFO) (also known as "factory farming") which is used for finishing livestock, notably beef cattle, prior to slaughter.
- fertigate – apply fertiliser through an irrigation system.
- fertility rate - number of live births per 1,000 women aged 15 to 44 years cf. birth rate, mortality rate.
- fertilizers (also spelled fertilisers) - compounds given to plants to promote growth; they are usually applied either through the soil, for uptake by plant roots, or by foliar feeding, for uptake through leaves.
- flyway - the flight paths used in bird migration. Flyways generally span over continents and often oceans.
- food chain (food webs, food networks and/or trophic networks) - the feeding relationships between species within an ecosystem.
- food miles - the emissions produced and resources needed to transport food and drink around the globe.
- food security - food produced in sufficient quantity to meet the full requirements of all people i.e. total global food supply equals the total global demand. For households it is the ability to purchase or produce the food they need for a healthy and active life (disposable income is a crucial issue). Women are typically gatekeepers of household food security. For national food security, the focus is on sufficient food for all people in a nation and it entails a combination of national production, imports and exports. Food security always has components of production, access and utilisation.
- footprint – (Ecological Footprint) in a very general environmental sense a "footprint" is a measure of environmental impact. However, this is usually expressed as an area of productive land (the footprint) needed to counteract the impact.
- forage - the plant material (mainly plant leaves) eaten by grazing animals.
- forest – land with a canopy cover greater than 30%.
- fossil fuel - any hydrocarbon deposit that can be burned for heat or power, such as coal, oil and natural gas (produces carbon dioxide when burnt); fuels formed from once-living organisms that have become fossilized over geological time.
- fossil water – groundwater that has remained in an aquifer for thousands or millions of years; when geologic changes seal the aquifer preventing further replenishment, the water becomes trapped inside and is then referred to as fossil water. Fossil water is a limited resource and can only be used once.
- freegan - a person using alternative strategies for living based on limited participation in the conventional economy and minimal consumption of resources. Freegans embrace community, generosity, social concern, freedom, cooperation, and sharing - in opposition to materialism, moral apathy, competition, conformity, and greed. The most notorious freegan strategy is "urban foraging" or "dumpster diving". This technique involves rummaging through the garbage of retailers, residences, offices, and other facilities for useful goods. The word freegan is compounded from "free" and "vegan". cf. affluenza, froogle.
- freon - DuPont's trade name for its odourless, colorless, nonflammable, and noncorrosive chlorofluorocarbon and hydrochlorofluorocarbon refrigerants, which are used in air conditioning and refrigeration systems
- fair trade - a guarantee that a fair price is paid to producers of goods or services; it includes a range of other social and environmental standards including safety standards and the right to form unions.
- freshwater - water containing no significant amounts of salt; potable water suitable for all normal uses cf. potable water.
- front – (weather) the boundary between warm (high pressure) and cold (low pressure) air masses.
- froogle - a play on the word frugal; people who lead low-consumption life-styles: a person who is part of a new movement towards self-sufficiency and waste-reduction achieved by bartering goods and services especially through the internet, making their own products, soap, clothes, and breeding chickens and goats, growing their own food, baking their own bread, harvesting their own water and energy, and helping to develop a sense of community. Sometimes referring to people who have made a resolution to only buy essentials for a particular period of time cf. freegan, affluenza.
- fugitive emissions - in the context of the National Greenhouse Gas Inventory, these are greenhouse gases emitted from fuel production itself including, processing, transmission, storage and distribution processes, and including emissions from oil and natural gas exploration, venting, and flaring, as well as the mining of black coal.
- full cost pricing - the pricing of commercial goods—such as electric power—that includes not only the private costs of inputs, but also the costs of the externalities required by their production and use cf. externality.

== G ==
- G8 - The Group of Eight is an international forum for the world's major industrialised democracies that emerged following the 1973 oil crisis and subsequent global recession. It includes Canada, France, Germany, Italy, Japan, Russia, the UK and the US which represents about 65% of the world economy.
- Gaia hypothesis - an ecological hypothesis that proposes that living and nonliving parts of the earth are a complex interacting system that can be thought of as a single organism.
- gene pool - the complete set of unique alleles in a species or population.
- generalist species - those able to thrive in a wide variety of environmental conditions and can make use of a variety of different resources.
- gene - a locatable region of genomic sequence, corresponding to a unit of inheritance, which is associated with regulatory regions, transcribed regions and/or other functional sequence regions.
- genetic diversity - one of the three levels of biodiversity that refers to the total number of genetic characteristics.
- greenhouse effect - the process in which the emission of infrared radiation by the atmosphere warms a planet's surface.
- greenhouse gas - components of the atmosphere that contribute to the greenhouse effect.
- green manure - a type of cover crop grown primarily to add nutrients and organic matter to the soil.
- Green Revolution - the ongoing transformation of agriculture that led in some places to significant increases in agricultural production between the 1940s and 1960s.
- groundwater - water located beneath the ground surface in soil pore spaces and in the fractures of lithologic formation.
- garden organics - organics derived from garden sources e.g. prunings, grass clippings.
- genetic engineering - the use of various experimental techniques to produce molecules of DNA containing new genes or novel combinations of genes, usually for insertion into a host cell for cloning; the technology of preparing recombinant DNA in vitro by cutting up DNA molecules and splicing together fragments from more than one organism; the modification of genetic material by man that would otherwise be subject to the forces of nature only.
- genome – the total genetic composition of an organism
- geosphere - the solid part of planet Earth, the main divisions being the crust, mantle, and liquid core. The lithosphere is the part of the geosphere that consists of the crust and upper mantle.
- geothermal energy - energy derived from the natural heat of the earth contained in hot rocks, hot water, hot brine or steam.
- global acres see global hectares.
- global dimming – a reduction in the amount of direct solar radiation reaching the surface of the earth due to light diffusion as a result of air pollution and increasing levels of cloud. A phenomenon of the last 30–50 years.
- economic globalization - the emerging international economy characterized by free trade in goods and services, unrestricted capital flows and more limited national powers to control domestic economies.
- global hectares - acres/hectares that have been adjusted according to world average biomass productivity so that they can be compared meaningfully across regions; 1 global hectare is 1 hectare of biologically productive space with world average productivity.
- global warming potential - a system of multipliers devised to enable warming effects of different gases to be compared.
- global warming – the observable increase in global temperatures considered mainly caused by the human induced enhanced greenhouse effect trapping the Sun's heat in the Earth's atmosphere.
- globalisation – the expansion of interactions to a global or worldwide scale; the increasing interdependence, integration and interaction among people and organisations from around the world. A mix of economic, social, technological, cultural, and political interrelationships.
- glyphosate – the active ingredient in the herbicide RoundupTM.
- governance – the decision-making procedure; who makes decisions, how they are made, and with what information. The structures and processes for collective decision-making involving governmental and non-governmental actors.
- Great Pacific Garbage Patch - a gyre of marine debris particles in the central North Pacific Ocean discovered between 1985 and 1988. The patch is characterized by exceptionally high relative pelagic concentrations of plastic, chemical sludge, and other debris that have been trapped by the currents of the North Pacific Gyre.
- green architecture - building design that moves towards self-sufficiency sustainability by adopting circular metabolism.
- green design - environmentally sustainable design.
- green power - Electricity generated from clean, renewable energy sources (such as solar, wind, biomass and hydro power) and supplied through the grid.
- green products and services - products or services that have a lesser or reduced effect on human health and the environment when compared with competing products or services that serve the same purpose. Green products or services may include, but are not limited to, those which contain recycled content, reduce waste, conserve energy or water, use less packaging, and reduce the amount of toxics disposed or consumed.
- green purchasing - purchasing goods and services that minimise impacts on the environment and that are socially just.
- Green Star – a voluntary building rating for green design covering 9 impact categories up to 6 stars which equals world leader.
- green waste (green organic material or green organics, sometimes referred to as "green wealth") - plant material discarded as non-putrescible waste - includes tree and shrub cuttings and prunings, grass clippings, leaves, natural (untreated) timber waste and weeds (noxious or otherwise).
- green – (sustainability) like ‘eco’ - a word frequently used to indicate consideration for the environment e.g. green plumbers, green purchasing etc., sometimes used as a noun e.g. the Greens.
- greenhouse effect - the insulating effect of atmospheric greenhouse gases (e.g., water vapor, carbon dioxide, methane, etc.) that keeps the Earth's temperature about 60 °F (16 °C) warmer than it would be otherwise cf. enhanced greenhouse effect.
- greenhouse gases - any gas that contributes to the greenhouse effect; gaseous constituents of the atmosphere, both natural and from human activity, that absorb and re-emit infrared radiation. Water vapor (H_{2}O) is the most abundant greenhouse gas. Greenhouse gases are a natural part of the atmosphere and include carbon dioxide (CO_{2}), methane (CH_{4}, persisting 9-15 yrs with a greenhouse warming potential (GWP) 22 times that of CO_{2}), nitrous oxide (N_{2}O persists 120 years and has a GWP of 310), ozone (O_{3}), hydrofluorocarbons, perfluorocarbons and sulfur hexafluoride.
- greenlash – dramatic changes in the structure and dynamic behaviour of ecosystems.
- greenwashing - companies that portray themselves as environmentally friendly when their business practices do not back this up. Generally applies to excessive use of green marketing and packaging when this does not take account of the total ecological footprint.
- greenwater – water replenishing soil moisture, evaporating from soil, plant and other surfaces, and transpired by plants. In nature the global average amount of rainfall becoming green water is about 60%. Of the green water about 55% falls on forests, 25% on grasslands and about 20% on crops. We can increase green water productivity by rainwater harvesting, increased infiltration and runoff collection. Green water cannot be piped or drunk (cannot be sold) and is therefore generally ignored by water management authorities but it is crucial to plants in both nature and agriculture and needs careful management as an important part of the global water cycle.
- greywater – household waste water that has not come into contact with toilet waste; includes water from baths, showers, bathrooms, washing machines, laundry and kitchen sinks.
- gross primary productivity - total carbon assimilation.
- groundwater – water found below the surface – usually in porous rocks, or soil, or in underground aquifers.
- growth – increase in size, weight, power etc.

== H ==
- habitat - an ecological or environmental area that is inhabited by a particular species.
- hard waste - household garbage which is not normally accepted into rubbish bins by local councils, e.g. old stoves, mattresses.
- heat– energy derived from the motion of molecules; a form of energy into which all other forms of energy may be degraded.
- herbicide – a chemical the kills or inhibits growth of a plant.
- herbivory - predation in which an organism known as an herbivore, consumes principally autotrophs such as plants, algae and photosynthesizing bacteria.
- heterotroph (chemoorganotrophy) - an organism that requires organic substrates to obtain its carbon for growth and development.
- hierarchy – an organisation of parts in which control from the top (generally with few parts), proceeds through a series of levels (ranks) to the bottom (generally of many parts) cf. heterarchy.
- high-density polyethylene (HDPE) - A member of the polyethylene family of plastics and is used to make products such as milk bottles, pipes and shopping bags. HDPE may be coloured or opaque.
- homoclime – a region with the same climate as the one under investigation.
- horsepower (hp) = 745.7 watts.
- homeostasis - the property of either an open system or a closed system, especially a living organism, that regulates its internal environment so as to maintain a stable, constant condition.
- Horton overland flow - the tendency of water to flow horizontally across land surfaces when rainfall has exceeded infiltration capacity and depression storage capacity.
- house energy rating - an assessment of the energy efficiency of residential house or unit designs using a 5 star scale.
- household metabolism - the passage of food, energy, water, goods, and waste through the household unit in a similar way to the metabolic activity of an organism cf. industrial metabolism.
- humus - organic material in soil lending it a bark brown or black colouration.
- human equivalent (He) - the approximate human daily energy requirement of 12,500 kJ or its approximate energy generating capacity at basal metabolic rate which is equivalent to about 80 watts (3.47222kWh/day). A 100 watt light bulb therefore runs at 1.25 He.
- humus – semi-persistent organic matter in the soil that can no longer be recognised as tissue.
- hydrocarbons - chemicals made up of carbon and hydrogen that are found in raw materials such as petroleum, coal and natural gas, and derived products such as plastics.
- hydroelectric power - the electrical power generated using the power of falling water.
- hydrological cycle (water cycle) - the natural cycle of water from evaporation, transpiration in the atmosphere, condensation (rain and snow), and flows back to the ocean (e.g. rivers).
- hydrosphere - all the Earth's water; this would include water found in the sea, streams, lakes and other waterbodies, the soil, groundwater, and in the air.

== I ==
- incineration - combustion (by chemical oxidation) of waste material to treat or dispose of that waste material.
- indicator species - any biological species that defines a trait or characteristic of the environment.
- industrial agriculture - a form of modern farming that involves industrialized production of livestock, poultry, fish, and crops.
- Industrial Revolution - a period in the late 18th and early 19th centuries when major changes in agriculture, manufacturing, and transportation had a profound effect on socioeconomic and cultural conditions.
- infiltration – movement of water below topsoil to the plant roots and below.
- infiltration - the process by which water on the ground surface enters the soil.
- indicators– quantitative markers for monitoring progress towards desired goals.
- industrial ecology (term int. Harry Zvi Evan 1973) - the observation that nature produces no waste and therefore provides an example of sustainable waste management. Natural Capitalism espouses industrial ecology as one of its four pillars together with energy conservation, material conservation, and redefinition of commodity markets and product stewardship in terms of a service economy. Publications:
- insecticide - a pesticide used to control insects in all developmental forms.
- Integrated Pest Management (IPM) - a pest control strategy that uses an array of complementary methods: natural predators and parasites, pest-resistant varieties, cultural practices, biological controls, various physical techniques, and the strategic use of pesticides.
- intercropping - the agricultural practice of cultivating two or more crops in the same space at the same time.
- in-stream - the use of freshwater where it occurs, usually within a river or stream: it includes hydroelectricity, recreation, tourism, scientific and cultural uses, ecosystem maintenance, and dilution of waste.
- integrated pest management (IPM) – pest management that attempts to minimise chemical use by using several pest control options in combination. The goal of IPM is not to eliminate all pests but to reduce pest populations to acceptable levels; an ecologically based pest control strategy that relies heavily on natural mortality factors and seeks out control tactics that disrupt these factors as little as possible.
- integrated product life-cycle management - management of all phases of goods and services to be environmentally friendly and sustainable.
- inter-generational equity – the intention to leave the world in the best possible condition for future generations.
- Intergovernmental Panel on Climate Change (IPCC) - the IPCC was established in 1988 by the World Meteorological Organization and the UN Environment Programme to provide the scientific and technical foundation for the United Nations Framework Convention on Climate Change (UNFCCC), primarily through the publication of periodic assessment reports.
- internal water footprint – the water embodied in goods produced within a country (although these may be subsequently exported) cf. external water footprint.
- intrinsic value – the value of something that is independent of its utility.
- irrigation index – an efficiency indicator showing degree of match between applied and used water. Ideal rating = 1, an Ii of 1.5 means an oversupply of water by 50%.
- irrigation scheduling – watering plants according to their needs.
- irrigation – important component for agriculture developed across cultures.
- ISO 14001- The international standard for companies seeking to certify their environmental management system. International Organization for Standardization (ISO) 14001 standard was first published in 1996 specifying the requirements for an environmental management system in organization (companies and institutions) with the goal of minimizing harmful effects on the environment and the goal of continual improvement of environmental performance.

== J ==
- joule (J)– the basic unit of energy; the equivalent of 1 watt of power radiated or dissipated for 1 second. Natural gas consumption is usually measured in megajoules (MJ), where 1 MJ = 1, 000,000 J. On large accounts it may be measured in gigajoules (GJ), where 1 GJ = 1 000,000,000 J.

== K ==
- kerbside collection - collection of household recyclable materials (separated or co-mingled) that are left at the kerbside for collection by local council services.
- keystone species - a species that has a disproportionate effect on its environment relative to its abundance, affecting many other organisms in an ecosystem and help in determine the types and numbers of various others species in a community.
- Kyoto Protocol - an international agreement adopted in December 1997 in Kyoto, Japan. The Protocol sets binding emission targets for developed countries that would reduce their emissions on average 5.2 percent below 1990 levels.

== L ==
- land use, Land-use change and forestry (LULUCF) - land uses and land-use changes can act either as sinks or as emission sources. It is estimated that approximately one-fifth of global emissions result from LULUCF activities. The Kyoto Protocol allows parties to receive emissions credit for certain LULUCF activities that reduce net emissions.
- landfill- solid waste disposal in which refuse is buried between layers of soil, a method often used to reclaim low-lying ground; the word is sometimes used as a noun to refer to the waste itself.
- landfill gas – the gas emissions from biodegrading waste in landfill, including CO_{2}, CH_{4}, and small amounts of nitrogen, oxygen with traces of toluene, benzene and vinyl chloride.
- landfill levy - levy applied at differential rates to municipal, commercial and industrial and prescribed wastes disposed to licensed landfills the levies used to foster the environmentally sustainable use of resources and best practice in waste management.
- landfill prohibition - The banning of a certain material or product type from disposal to landfills. Occurs occasionally, for example, where a preferable waste management option is available.
- landfill (dump or tip and historically as a midden) - a site for the disposal of waste materials by burial and is the oldest form of waste treatment.
- land use planning - a branch of public policy which encompasses various disciplines which seek to order and regulate the use of land in an efficient and ethical way.
- leaching – the movement of chemical in the upper layers of soil into lower layers or into groundwater by being dissolved in water.
- lithosphere - the solid outermost shell of a rocky planet.

considered ideal for gardening and agricultural uses.

- leachate (waste) - the mixture of water and dissolved solids (possibly toxic) that accumulates as water passes through waste and collects at the bottom of a landfill site.
- leaf area index (LAI) – the ratio of photosynthetic leaf area to ground area covered (optimal for photosynthesis = 3-5). LAI is often optimised by shifts in leaf angle, a form of solar tracking.
- 'level (scale, context or framework) – a context, frame of reference or degree of organisation within an integrated system. A level may or may not be spatially delimited.
- life cycle (of a product) - All stages of a product's development, from raw materials, manufacturing through to consumption and ultimate disposal.
- Life Cycle Analysis (LCA) - an objective process to evaluate the environmental impacts associated with a product, process, or activity. A means of identifying resource use and waste released to the environment, and to assess management options.
- life support systems - according to the World Conservation Union (IUCN), the biophysical processes "that sustain the productivity, adaptability and capacity for renewal of lands, waters, and / or the biosphere as a whole."
- lilacwater – recycled water that is unsuitable for drinking.
- linear low-density polyethylene - a member of the polyolefin family of plastics. It is a strong and flexible plastic and usually used in film for packaging, bags and for industrial products such as pressure pipe.
- linear metabolism - direct conversion of resources into wastes that are often sent directly to landfill
- loam - a soil composed of sand, silt, and clay in relatively even concentration (about 40-40-20% concentration respectively), *locally existing capacity - the total ecological production that is found within a country's territories. It is usually expressed in hectares based on world average productivity.
- low-density polyethylene - A member of the polyolefin family of plastics. It is a flexible material and usually used as film for packaging or as bags.
- low entropy energy - to high-quality energy, or energy that is concentrated and available. Electricity is considered the energy carrier with the lowest entropy (i.e. highest quality) as it can be transformed into mechanical energy at efficiency rates well above 90%. In contrast, fossil fuel chemical energy can only be converted into mechanical energy at a typical efficiency rate of 25% (cars) to 50 percent (modern power plants). The chemical energy of biomass is of lower quality.

== M ==
- magma - molten rock that sometimes forms beneath the surface of the Earth (or any other terrestrial planet) that often collects in a magma chamber and is ejected by volcano's.
- manure - organic matter used as fertilizer in agriculture.
- market benefits - benefits of a climate policy that can be measured in terms of avoided market impacts such as changes in resource productivity (e.g., lower agricultural yields, scarcer water resources) and damages to human-built environment (e.g., coastal flooding due to sea-level rise).
- material flow – the cycling of materials, which is driven by the flow of energy.
- material identification - words, numbers or symbols used to designate composition of components of a product or packaging. Note: a material identification symbol does not indicate whether an item can be recycled.
- materials recovery facility (MRF) - a centre for the reception and transfer of materials recovered from the waste stream. At a MRF, materials are also sorted by type and treated (e.g. cleaned, compressed)
- Mauna Loa record - the record of measurement of atmospheric CO_{2} concentrations taken at Mauna Loa Observatory, Mauna Loa, Hawaii, since March 1958. This record shows the continuing increase in average annual atmospheric CO_{2} concentrations.
- maximum soil water deficit – amount of water stored in the soil that is readily available to plants
- megadiverse countries – The 17 countries that are home to the largest fraction of wild species (Australia is one such)
- microorganism – an organism visible only through a microscope.
- middle East– 15 countries - Bahrain, Islamic Rep. Iran, Iraq, Israel, Jordan, Kuwait, Lebanon, Oman, Qatar, Saudi Arabia, Syria, United Arab Emirates, Yemen.
- mitigation hierarchy - a tool that aims to help management of biodiversity risk and is commonly applied in Environmental Impact Assessments. It includes a hierarchy of steps (but is not limited to): avoidance, minimisation, rehabilitation, restoration, and offset.
- mobile garbage bin - A wheeled kerbside container for the collection of garbage or other materials.
- monoculture - the practice of producing or growing one single crop over a wide area.
- Montreal Protocol –an international treaty signed in 1987 designed to protect the ozone layer by phasing out the production of numerous substances that are responsible for ozone depletion, especially CFC's.
- mortality rate – generally understood as the total number of deaths per 1000 people of a given age group
- mulch - any composted or non-composted organic material, excluding plastic, that is suitable for placing on soil surfaces to restrict moisture loss from the soil and to provide a source of nutrients to the soil.
- municipal waste - solid waste generated from domestic premises (garbage and hard waste) and council activities such as street sweeping, litter and street tree lopping. Also includes waste dropped at transfer stations and construction waste from owner/occupier renovations.

== N ==
- National Packaging Covenant - a self-regulatory agreement between packaging industries and government.
- natural- the existing air, water, land and energy resources from which all resources derive. Main functions include resource production (such as fish, timber or cereals), waste assimilation (such as CO_{2} absorption, sewage decomposition), and life support services (UV protection, biodiversity, water cleansing, climate stability). The environmental services that must be maintained so that human development can be sustainable.
- natural capital - natural resources and ecological processes that are equivalent to financial capital.
- natural resources - naturally occurring substances that are considered valuable in their relatively unmodified (natural) form.
- natural selection - the process by which favorable heritable traits become more common in successive generations of a population of reproducing organisms, and unfavorable heritable traits become less common.
- nature-positive - a global societal goal to halt and reverse nature loss by 2030, measured from a 2020 baseline, and with the aim of achieving full recovery by 2050.
- neighbourhood environment improvement plan - plans developed by a local community including residents, special interest groups, local government, local industry and government agencies.
- nematocide – a chemical that kills nematodes.
- net primary production - the energy or biomass content of plant material that has accumulated in an ecosystem over a period of time through photosynthesis. It is the amount of energy left after subtracting the respiration of primary producers (mostly plants) from the total amount of solar energy that is fixed biologically; gross primary productivity minus respiratory losses (this is the carbon gain).
- nickel cadmium batteries - batteries typically used in appliances such as power tools and mobile phones. Cadmium is a heavy metal that poses risk to human and ecosystem health.
- noise pollution (environmental noise) - displeasing human or machine created sound that disrupts the activity or happiness of human or animal life.
- nonpoint source pollution - water pollution affecting a water body from diffuse sources, rather than a point source which discharges to a water body at a single location.
- no-till farming - considered a kind of conservation tillage system and is sometimes called zero tillage.
- no net loss - biodiversity policies that aim to neutralise biodiversity loss, defined relative to an appropriate reference scenario; it is the point at which project-related impacts on biodiversity are balanced by measures taken to avoid and minimise the project's impacts.
- non-ferrous metals - those metals that contain little or no iron, e.g. copper, brass and bronze.
- Non Government Organisation (NGO) - A not-for-profit or community-based organization.
- nutrients – chemicals required for the growth of organisms. Phosphorus, nitrogen and potassium are major plant nutrients but there are also many trace elements, elements that are needed in small quantities for the growing and developing of animal and plant life.

== O ==
- Ocean acidification - reduction in pH. Caused by their uptake of anthropogenic carbon dioxide from the atmosphere.
- Oceania - the islands of the southern, western, and central Pacific Ocean, including Melanesia, Micronesia, and Polynesia. Sometimes extended to encompass Australia, New Zealand, and Maritime Southeast Asia.
- old growth forest - an area of forest that has attained great age and so exhibits unique biological features.
- omnivore - a species of animal that eats both plants and animals as its primary food source.
- open-pit mining (opencast mining, open-cut mining) - a method of extracting rock or minerals from the earth by their removal from an open pit or borrow.
- old growth forests - forests dominated by mature trees and with little or no evidence of any disturbance such as logging, ground clearing and building.
- organic agriculture - a holistic production management system that avoids the use of synthetic fertilisers, pesticides and GM organisms, minimises pollution of air, soil and water, and optimises the health and productivity of interdependent communities of plants, animals and people.
- organic gardening – gardening that follows, in general principle, the philosophy of organic agriculture
- organic – derived from a living organism.
- organics - plant or animal matter originating from domestic or industrial sources, e.g. grass clippings, tree prunings, food waste.
- overshoot- growth beyond an area's carrying capacity; ecological deficit occurs when human consumption and waste production exceed the capacity of the Earth to create new resources and absorb waste. During overshoot, natural capital is being liquidated to support current use so the Earth's ability to support future life declines.

== P ==
- Patterns in nature - are visible regularities of form found in the natural world.
- pay-by-weight systems - financial approaches to managing waste that charge prices according to the quantity of waste collected, rather than a price per pick-up or fixed annual charge, as typically applied to households for kerbside services. Pay-by-weight systems may provide an incentive to reduce waste generation.
- per capita consumption - the average amount of commodity used per person.
- Persistent organic pollutants (POPs) - organic compounds that are resistant to environmental degradation through chemical, biological, and photolytic processes.
- pervious surface – one which can be penetrated by air and water.
- pesticide - means any substance or mixture of substances intended for preventing, destroying or controlling any pest. This includes substances intended for use as a plant growth regulator, defoliant, desiccant, or agent for thinning fruit or preventing the premature fall of fruit, and substances applied to crops either before or after harvest to protect the commodity from deterioration during storage and transport. (Food and Agriculture Organization of the United Nations, 2003).
- photosynthesis – the transformation of radiant energy to chemical energy by plants; the manufacture by plants of carbohydrates from carbon dioxide and water. The reaction is driven by energy from sunlight, catalysed by chlorophyll and releases oxygen as a byproduct. The capture of the Sun's energy (primary production) to power all life on Earth (consumption).
- photovoltaic - the direct conversion of light into electricity
- phytoplankton– plant plankton cf. Plankton.
- plankton – mostly microscopic animal and plant life suspended in water and a valuable food source for animals cf. Phytoplankton.
- plant quality - a standard of plant appearance or yield.
- plastic - One of many high-polymeric substances, including both natural and synthetic products, but excluding rubbers. At some stage in its manufacture every plastic is capable of flowing, under heat and pressure, if necessary, into the desired final shape.
- Polluter Pays Principle (PPP) - the principle that producers of pollution should in some way compensate others for the effects of their pollution.
- polyethylene terephthalate (PET) – a clear, tough, light and shatterproof type of plastic, used to make products such as soft drink bottles, film packaging and fabrics.
- polypropylene (PP) - a member of the polyelofin family of plastics. PP is light, rigid and glossy and is used to make products such as washing machine agitators, clear film packaging, carpet fibres and housewares.
- polystyrene (PS) - a member of the styrene family of plastics. PS is easy to mould and is used to make refrigerator and washing machine components. It can be foamed to make single use packaging, such as cups, meat and produce trays.
- polyvinyl chloride (PVC) - a member of the vinyl family of plastics. PVC can be clear, flexible or rigid and is used to make products such as fruit juice bottles, credit cards, pipes and hoses.
- postconsumer material or waste - material or product that has served its intended purpose and has been discarded for disposal or recovery. This includes returns of material from the distribution chain; waste that is collected and sorted after use; kerbside waste cf. pre-consumer waste.
- potable – safe to drink.
- power- the rate at which work is done; electrically, power = current x voltage (P = I V)
- Precautionary Principle – where there are threats of serious irreversible environmental damage, lack of full scientific certainty should not be used as a reason for introducing measures to prevent that degradation (Rio Declaration).
- precipitation – (weather) any liquid or solid water particles that fall from the atmosphere to the Earth's surface; includes drizzle, rain, snow, snow pellets, ice crystals, ice pellets and ha
- preconsumer material or waste - material diverted to the waste stream during a manufacturing process; waste from manufacture and production.
- pre-industrial - for the purposes of the IPCC this is defined as 1750.
- prescribed waste and prescribed industrial waste - Those wastes listed in the Environment Protection (Prescribed Waste) Regulations 1998 and subject to requirements under the industrial waste management policy 2000. Prescribed wastes carry special handling, storage, transport and often licensing requirements, and attract substantially higher disposal levies than non-prescribed solid wastes.
- primary productivity - the fixation rate at which energy is fixed by plants.
- producer responsibility – the legal responsibilities of producers/manufacturers for the full life of their products.
- producer – (ecology) a plant, that is able to produce its own food from inorganic substance; (energetics) an organism or process that generates concentrated energy from sunlight beyond its own needs.
- product stewardship – the principle of shared responsibility by all sectors involved in the manufacture, distribution, use and disposal of products for the consequences of these activities; manufacturing responsibility extending to the entire life of the product.
- Product – a thing produced by labour; mostly the material items we buy in shops; (ecology) the results of photosynthesis.
- productivity (ecology) - the rate at which radiant energy is used by producers to form organic substances as food for consumers.
- provisioning services – one of the major ecosystem services: the products obtained from ecosystems e.g. genetic resources, food, fibre and fresh water.
- pyrolysis - advanced thermal technology involving the thermal decomposition of organic compounds in the complete absence of oxygen under pressure and at elevated temperature.

== R ==
- radiative forcing - changes in the energy balance of the earth-atmosphere system in response to a change in factors such as greenhouse gases, land-use change, or solar radiation. Positive radiative forcing increases the temperature of the lower atmosphere, which in turn increases temperatures at the Earth's surface. Negative radiative forcing cools the lower atmosphere. Radiative forcing is most commonly measured in units of watts per square meter (W/m2).
- rain garden – an engineered area for the collection, infiltration and evapotranspiration of rainwater runoff, mostly from impervious surfaces; it reduces rain runoff by allowing stormwater to soak into the ground (as opposed to flowing into storm drains and surface waters which can cause erosion, water pollution, flooding, and diminished groundwater). They can also absorb water contaminants that would otherwise end up in water bodies. The terminology arose in Maryland, USA in the 1990s as a more marketable expression for bioremediation.
- rainwater harvesting – collecting rainwater either in storages or the soil mostly close to where it falls; the attempt to increase rainwater productivity by storing it in pondages, wetlands etc., and helping to avoid the need for infrastructure to bring water from elsewhere. Practiced on a large scale upstream this reduces available water downstream.
- rangeland – a region where grazing or browsing livestock is the main land use.
- raw materials - materials that are extracted from the ground and processed e.g. bauxite is processed into aluminium.
- reclaimed water - water taken from a waste (effluent) stream and purified to a level suitable for further use.
- recovered material – (waste) material that would have otherwise been disposed of as waste or used for energy recovery, but has instead been collected and recovered (reclaimed) as a material input thus avoiding the use of new primary materials.
- recovery rate – (waste) the recovery rate is the percentage of materials consumed that is recovered for recycling.
- recyclables – strictly, all materials that may be recycled, but this may include the recyclable containers and paper/cardboard component of kerbside waste (excluding garden organics).
- recycled content - proportion, by mass, of recycled material in a product or packaging. Only pre-consumer and post-consumer materials are considered as recycled content.
- recycled material – see recovered material.
- recycled water – treated stormwater, greywater or blackwater suitable for uses like toilet flushing, irrigation, industry etc. It is non-drinking water and is indicated using a lilac non-drinking label.
- recycling - a wide range of activities, including collection, sorting, reprocessing and manufacture of products into new goods.
- reforestation – the direct human conversion of non-forested land to forested land through planting, seeding or promotion of natural seed sources, on land that was once forested but no longer so. According to the language of the Kyoto Protocol, for the first commitment period (2008–2012), reforestation activities are limited to reforestation occurring on lands that did not contain forest at the start of 1990; replanting of forests on lands that have recently been harvested.
- regulating services – (sustainability) the benefits obtained from the regulation of ecosystem processes including, for example, the regulation of climate, water or disease.
- renewable energy - any source of energy that can be used without depleting its reserves. These sources include sunlight (solar energy) and other sources such as, wind, wave, biomass, geothermal and hydro energy.
- renewable energy certificates - Market trading mechanisms created through the Renewable Energy (Electricity) Act 2000 in connection with the commonwealth government's mandatory renewable energy target. The certificates provide a 'premium' revenue stream for electricity generated from renewable sources.
- reprocessing – (waste) changing the physical structure and properties of a waste material that would otherwise have been sent to landfill, in order to add financial value to the processed material, this may involve a range of technologies including composting, anaerobic digestion and energy from waste technologies such as pyrolysis, gasification and incineration.
- residual waste – (waste) waste that remains after the separation of recyclable materials (including green waste).
- resource flow - the totality of changes in multiple resource stocks, or at least any pair of them, over a specified period of time
- resource intensity – ratio of resource consumption relative to its economic or physical output; for example, litres of water used per dollar spent, or litres of water used per tonne of aluminium produced. At the national level, energy intensity is the ratio of total primary energy consumption of the country to either the gross domestic product, or the physical output (total goods produced).
- resource productivity – the output obtained for a given resource input.
- resource recovery – (waste) the process of obtaining matter or energy from discarded materials.
- resource stock - the total amount of a resource often related to resource flow (the amount of resources harvested or used per unit of time). To harvest a resource stock sustainably, the harvest must not exceed the net production of the stock. Stocks are measured in mass, volume, or energy and flows in mass, volume, or energy per unit of time.
- respiration – (biology) uptake by a living organism of oxygen from the air (or water) which is then used to oxidise organic matter or food. The outputs of this oxidation are usually CO_{2} and H_{2}O; the metabolic process by which organisms meet their internal energy needs and release CO_{2}.
- retail therapy – using shopping to obtain a ‘lift’ to make up for other things lacking in our lives.
- retrofit - to replace existing items with updated items.
- reuse - the second pillar of the waste hierarchy - recovering value from a discarded resource without reprocessing or remanufacture e.g.clothes sold though opportunity shops strictly represent a form of re-use, rather than recycling
- risk – the probability of a (negative) occurrence.

== S ==
- salinisation – (ecology) the process by which land becomes salt-affected.
- salinity – (ecology) salt in water and soils, generally in the context of human activity such as clearing and planting for annual crops rather than perennial trees and shrubs. Can make soils infertile.
- scale – the physical dimensions, in either space or time, of phenomena or events; cf. a level which may or may not have a scale.
- sectors – (economics) economic groupings used to generalise patterns of expenditure and use.
- sediment – (ecology) soil or other particles that settle to the bottom of water bodies.
- self-organisation – the process by which systems use energy to develop structure and organisation.
- sentinel indicator – (ecology) an indicator that captures the essence of the process of change affecting a broad area of interest and which is also easily communicated.
- septic sewage – sewage in which anaerobic respiration is taking place characterised by a blackish colour and smell of hydrogen sulphide.
- septic tank - a type of sedimentation tank in which the sludge is retained long enough for the organic content to undergo anaerobic digestion. Typically used for receiving the sewage from houses and other premises that are too isolated for connection to a sewer.
- sequestration – (global warming) the removal of carbon dioxide from the Earth's atmosphere and storage in a sink as when trees absorb CO_{2} in photosynthesis and store it in their tissues.
- sewage- water and raw effluent disposed through toilets, kitchens and bathrooms. Includes water-borne wastes from domestic uses of water from households, or similar uses in trade or industry.
- sewer - a pipe conveying sewage.
- sewerage - a system of pipes and mechanical appliances for the collection and transportation of domestic and industrial sewages.
- sewerage system – sewage system infrastructure: the network of pipes, pumping stations and treatment plants used to collect, transport, treat and discharge sewage.
- sewer-mining - tapping directly into a sewer (either before or after a sewage treatment plant) and extracting wastewater for treatment and use.
- shredder flock - the residue from shredded car bodies, whitegoods and the like.
- Silent Spring - environmental science book by Rachel Carson published in 1962 that inspired the environmental movement and later led to the creation of the U.S. Environmental Protection Agency in 1970.
- simple living - a lifestyle individuals may pursue for a variety of motivations, such as spirituality, health, or ecology. Others may choose simple living for reasons of social justice or a rejection of consumerism. Some may emphasise an explicit rejection of "westernised values", while others choose to live more simply for reasons of personal taste, a sense of fairness or for personal economy. Simple living as a concept is distinguished from the simple lifestyles of those living in conditions of poverty in that its proponents are consciously choosing to not focus on wealth directly tied to money or cash-based economics.
- sinks - processes or places that remove or store gases, solutes or solids; any process, activity or mechanism that results in the net removal of greenhouse gases, aerosols, or precursors of greenhouse gases from the atmosphere.
- slow Food – the slow food movement was founded in Italy in 1986 by Carlo Petrini as a response to the negative impact of multinational food industries. Slow Food is a counteracting force to Fast Food as it encourages using local seasonal produce, restoring time-honoured methods of production and preparation, and sharing food at communal tables. Slow Food encourages environmentally sustainable production, ethical treatment of animals and social justice. Gatherings of Slow Food supporters are called convivia and in September Victoria has 11 of these. Slow Food members seek to defend biodiversity in our food supply, to better appreciate how our lives can be improved by understanding the sensation of taste, and to celebrate the connection between plate and planet.
- sludge - waste in a state between liquid and solid.
- sodicity – (ecology) a measure of the sodium content of soil. Sodic soils are dispersible and are thus vulnerable to erosion.
- sodification - the build-up in soils of sodium relative to potassium and magnesium in the composition of the exchangeable cations of the clay fraction.
- soil acidification - reduction in pH, usually in soil. Acidification can result in poorly structured or hard-setting topsoils that cannot support sufficient vegetation to prevent erosion.
- soil bulk density – the relative density of a soil measured by dividing the dry weight of a soil by its volume.
- soil compaction – the degree of compression of soil. Heavy compaction can impede plant growth.
- soil conditioner - any composted or non-composted material of organic origin that is produced or distributed for adding to soils, it includes 'soil amendment', 'soil additive', 'soil improver' and similar materials, but excludes polymers that do not biodegrade, such as plastics, rubbers, and coatings.
- soil moisture deficit – the volume of water needed to raise the soil water content of the root zone to field capacity.
- soil organic carbon (SOC) – the total organic carbon of a soil exclusive of carbon from undecayed plant and animal residue.
- soil organic matter (SOM) – the organic fraction of the soil exclusive of undecayed plant and animal residues.
- soil structure – the way soil particles are aggregated into aggregates or “crumbs”, important for the passage of air and water
- soil water storage – total amount of water stored in the soil in the plant root zone.
- solar energy - the radiant energy of the Sun, which can be converted into other forms of energy, such as heat or electricity.
- solar power - electricity generated from solar radiation.
- solid industrial waste - solid waste generated from commercial, industrial or trade activities, including waste from factories, offices, schools, universities, State and Federal government operations and commercial construction and demolition work. Excludes wastes that are prescribed under the Environment Protection Act 1970 and quarantine wastes.
- solid inert waste - hard waste and dry vegetative material and which as a negligible activity or effect on the environment, such as demolition material, concrete, bricks, plastic, glass, metals and shredded tyres.
- solid waste - non-hazardous, non-prescribed solid waste materials ranging from municipal garbage to industrial waste, generally: domestic and municipal; commercial and industrial; construction and demolition; other.
- source separation – (waste) separation of recyclable material from other waste at the point and time the waste is generated, i.e. at its source. This includes separation of recyclable material into its component categories, e.t. paper, glass, aluminium, and may include further separation within each category, e.g. paper into computer paper, office whites and newsprint; The practice of segregating materials into discrete materials streams prior to collection by or delivery to reprocessing facilities.
- specialist species – those that can only thrive in a narrow range of environmental conditions and/or have a limited diet.
- specific heat capacity – the amount of energy needed to increase the temperature of 1 kg of a substance by 1oC. It can be considered a measure of resistance to an increase in temperature and important for energy saving.
- stakeholders - parties having an interest in a particular project or outcome.
- State Environment Protection Policies - statutory instruments under the Environment Protection Act 1970 that identify beneficial uses of the environment that are to be protected, establish environmental indicators and objectives and define attainment programs to implement the policies.
- State of the Environment reporting - a scientific assessment of environmental conditions, focusing on the impacts of human activities, their significance for the environment and social responses to the identified trends.
- steady state – a constant pattern e.g. a balance of inflows and outflows.
- stormwater – rainfall that accumulates in natural or artificial systems after heavy rain; surface run-off or water sent to (stormwater) drains during heavy rain.
- strategic Environmental Assessment (SEA) - a system of incorporating environmental considerations into policies, plans and programs esp in the EU.
- sullage – domestic waste water from baths, basins, showers, laundries, kitchens and floor waste (but not from toilets).
- Superfund –a United States federal government program designed to fund the cleanup of sites contaminated with hazardous substances and pollutants. It was established as the Comprehensive Environmental Response, Compensation, and Liability Act of 1980 (CERCLA).
- supporting services – (sustainability) ecosystem services that are necessary for the production of all other ecosystem services e.g. biomass production, production of atmospheric oxygen, soil formation, nutrient and water cycling.
- surface runoff – that part of rainfall passing out of an area into the drainage system.
- suspended solids (SS) – solid particles suspended in water; used as an indicator of water quality.
- sustainability - the Brundtland definition is ‘Sustainable development is development that meets the needs of the present without compromising the ability of future generations to meet their own needs’.
- sustainability covenant - Under Section 49 of the Environment Protection Act 1970, a Sustainability Covenant is an agreement which a person or body undertakes to increase the resource use efficiency and/or reduce ecological impacts of activities, products, services and production processes. Parties can voluntarily enter into such agreements with EPA, or could be required to if they are declared by Governor in Council, on the recommendation of EPA, to have potential for significant impact on the environment.
- sustainability science - the multidisciplinary scientific study of sustainability, focusing especially on the quantitative dynamic interactions between nature and society. Its objective is a deeper and more fundamental understanding of the rapidly growing inter-dependence of the nature-society system and the intention to make this sustainable. It critically examines the tools used by sustainability accounting and the methods of sustainability governance.
- sustainability Triangle – a graphic indication of the action needed to stabilize CO_{2} levels below about 500 ppm. It shows stabilization ‘wedges’ indicating savings made per year by the use of a particular strategy.
- sustainable consumption - sustainable resource use - a change to society's historical patterns of consumption and behaviour that enables consumers to satisfy their needs with better performing products or services that use fewer resources, cause less pollution and contribute to social progress worldwide.
- sustainable development – see Sustainability.
- swale – an open channel transporting surface run-off to a drainage system, usually grassed; a swale promotes infiltration, the filtration of sediment by plants and ornamental interest.
- system – a set of parts organised into a whole, usually processing a flow of energy.

== T ==
- take-back - a concept commonly associated with product stewardship, placing responsibility on brand-owners, retailers, manufacturers or other supply chain partners to accept products returned by consumers once they have reached the end of their useful life. Products may then be recycled, treated or sent to landfill.
- technosphere – synthetic and composite components and materials for med by human activity. True technosphere materials, like plastics, are not biodegradable.
- temperate – with moderate temperatures, weather, or climate; neither hot nor cold; mean annual temperature between 0 – 20 deg C.
- thermal mass – (architecture) any mass that can absorb and store heat and can therefore be used to buffer temperature change. Concrete, bricks and tiles need a lot of heat energy to change their temperature and therefore have high thermal mass, timber has low thermal mass.
- third pipe system – a third pipe, in addition to the standard water supply pipe and sewer disposal pipe, which carries recycled water for irrigation purposes.
- threshold – (ecology) a point that, when crossed, can bring rapid and sometimes unpredictable change in a trend. An example would be the sudden altering of ocean currents due to the melting of ice at the poles.
- topsoil – mostly fertile surface soil moved or introduced to topdress gardens, roadbanks, lawns etc.
- total energy use – as applied in this book is the total of combined direct and indirect energy use
- total fertility rate – the number of children that, on average, a woman would have in her lifetime at present age-specific fertility rates. Calculated as the average number of children born per woman of every given age in a particular year and totalled for all ages.
- total water use - in water accounting: distributed water use + self-extracted water use + reuse water use cf. water consumption; here used to mean total direct and indirect water use.
- town water – water supplied by government or private enterprise and known as the mains or reticulated water supply.
- transfer station – (waste) a facility allowing drop-off and consolidation of garbage and a wide range of recyclable materials. Transfer stations have become an integral part of municipal waste management, playing an important role in materials recovery and improving transportation economics associated with municipal waste disposal.
- transgenic plant – a plant into which genetic material has been transferred by genetic engineering.
- Triple Bottom Line – a form of sustainability accounting going beyond the financial ‘bottom line’ to consider the social and environmental as well as economic consequences of an organisation's activity; generally included with economic accounts. Term coined by John Elkington in 1994
- tropical – occurring in the tropics (the region on either side of the equator); hot and humid with a mean annual temperature greater than 20oC.
- turbine - A machine for converting the heat energy in steam or high temperature gas into mechanical energy. In a turbine, a high velocity flow of steam or gas passes through successive rows of radial blades fastened to a central shaft.

== U ==
- United Nations - an international organisation based in New York and formed to promote international peace, security, and cooperation under a charter signed by 51 founding countries in San Francisco in 1945
- United Nations Framework Convention on Climate Change (UNFCCC) – The UNFCCC and the Convention on Biological Diversity (CBD) were established at the 1992 U.N. Conference on Environment and Development in Rio de Janeiro, Brazil. The Kyoto Protocol was then formulated by the UNFCCC and sets specific timelines and timetables for reducing industrialized nations’ GHG emissions and allows some international trading in carbon credits. For more information visit:
- upstream – those processes necessary before a particular activity is completed e.g. for a manufactured product this would be the extraction, transport of materials etc. needed prior to the process of manufacture cf. downstream.
- urban heat island - the tendency for urban areas to have warmer air temperatures than the surrounding rural landscape, due to the low albedo of streets, sidewalks, parking lots, and buildings. These surfaces absorb solar radiation during the day and release it at night, resulting in higher night temperatures.
- urban metabolism – the functional flow of materials and energy required by cities.

== V ==
- veloway - cycle track; cycleway; contrasts with freeway.
- vinyl - a type of plastic (usually PVC) used to make products such as fruit juice bottles, credit cards, pipes and hoses.
- virtual water - the volume of water required to produce a commodity or service. First coined by Professor J.A. Allan of the University of London in the early 1990s, though this is now more widely known as cf. embedded (embodied) water.
- visual waste audit - observing, estimating and recording data on waste streams and practices without physical weighing.
- volatile organic compound (VOC) – molecules containing carbon and differing proportions of other elements such as hydrogen, oxygen, fluorine and chlorine. With sunlight and heat they form ground-level ozone.
- volt - The unit of potential difference between two points is the volt (V) (commonly called voltage). One thousand volts equals 1 kilovolt (kV).

== W ==
- waste - any material (liquid, solid or gaseous) that is produced by domestic households and commercial, institutional, municipal or industrial organisations, and which cannot be collected and recycled in any way for further use. For solid wastes, this involves materials that currently go to landfills, even though some of the material is potentially recyclable.
- waste analysis -the quantifying of different waste streams, recording and detailing of it as a proportion of the total waste stream, determining its destination and recording details of waste practices.
- waste assessment - observing, measuring, and recording data and collecting and analysing waste samples. Some practitioners consider an assessment to be one where observations are carried out visually, without sorting and measuring individual streams (see visual waste audit).
- waste audit -see waste assessment.
- waste avoidance – primary pillar of the waste hierarchy; avoidance works on the principle that the greatest gains result from efficiency-centred actions that remove or reduce the need to consume materials in the first place, but deliver the same outcome.
- waste factors - (used in round-wood calculations) give the ratio of one cubic metre of round wood used per cubic metre (or tonne) of product.
- waste generation - generation of unwanted materials including recyclables as well as garbage. Waste generation = materials recycled + waste to landfill.
- waste hierarchy (waste management hierarchy)– a concept promoting waste avoidance ahead of recycling and disposal, often referred to in community education campaigns as 'reduce, reuse, recycle.' The waste hierarchy is recognised in the Environment Protection Act 1970, promoting management of wastes in the order of preference: avoidance, reuse, recycling, recovery of energy, treatment, containment, disposal.
- waste management - practices and procedures that relate to how the waste is dealt with.
- waste minimisation - techniques to keep waste generation at a minimum level in order to divert materials from landfill and thereby reduce the requirement for waste collection, handling and disposal to landfill; recycling and other efforts made to reduce the amount of waste going into the waste stream.
- waste reduction - Measures to reduce the amount of waste generated by an individual, household or organisation.
- waste stream - Waste materials that are either of a particular type (e.g. 'timber waste stream') or produced a particular source (e.g. 'C&I waste stream').
- waste treatment - where some additional processing is undertaken of a particular waste. This may be done to reduce its toxicity, or increase its degradability or compostability.
- wastewater - used water; generally not suitable for drinking.
- water consumption - in water accounting: distributed water use + self-extracted water use + reuse water use - distributed water supplied to other users - in-stream use (where applicable).
- water cycle (hydrological cycle) passage of the water between the oceans and waterbodies, land and atmosphere.
- water entitlement - the entitlement, as defined in a statutory water plan, to a share of water from a water source.
- Water Footprint - the total volume of freshwater that is required in a given period to perform a particular task or to produce the goods and services consumed at any level of the action hierarchy. Country water footprint is a concept introduced by Hoekstra in 2002 as a consumption-based indicator of water use in a country – the volume of water needed to produce the goods and services consumed by the inhabitants of a country.
- water harvesting – see rainwater harvesting.
- water intensity - volume of water used per unit of production or service delivery; this is generally further reduced to monetary unit return per given volume of water used. Essentially equivalent to water productivity.
- water neutral – a scientifically based calculator for individuals to be extended to cover the construction industry, the food and beverage sector and other corporations or organisations. The water offset calculators aimed at business and other organisations are being developed and will be launched with the Individual Water Offset Calculator.
- water productivity – the efficiency of outcomes for the amount of water used; the quantity of water required to produce a given outcome. WP-field relates to crop output e.g. kg of wheat produced per m3 of water. WP-basin relates to water productivity in the widest possible sense as including crop, fishery yield, environmental services etc. Increasing WP means obtaining increasing value from the available water.
- water quality - the microbiological, biological, physical and chemical characteristics of water.
- water resources - water in various forms, such as groundwater, surface water, snow and ice, at present in the land phase of the hydrological cycle—some parts may be renewable seasonally, but others may be effectively mined.
- water restrictions - mandatory staged restrictions on the use of water, which are relative to water storage levels.
- water trading - transactions involving water access entitlements or water allocations assigned to water access entitlements.
- water treatment - the process of converting raw untreated water to a public water supply safe for human consumption; can involve, variously, screening, initial disinfection, clarification, filtration, pH correction and final disinfection.
- water table – upper level of water in saturated ground.
- watershed – a water catchment area (North America) or drainage divide (non-American usage).
- weather - the hourly/daily change in atmospheric conditions which over a longer period constitute the climate of a region cf. climate.
- weathering - is the breaking down of rocks, soil, and minerals as well as wood and artificial materials through contact with the Earth's atmosphere, water, and biological organisms.
- well-being – a context-dependent physical and mental condition determined by the presence of basic material for a good life, freedom and choice, health, good social relations, and security.
- wetlands - areas of permanent or intermittent inundation, whether natural or artificial, with water that is static or flowing, fresh, brackish or salt, including areas of marine water not exceeding 6 m at low tide. (Adapted from definition of the Ramsar Convention on Wetlands of International Importance). Engineered wetlands are becoming more frequent and are sometimes called constructed wetlands. In urban areas wetlands are sometimes referred to as the kidney of a city.
- whitegoods - household electrical appliances like refrigerators, washing machines, clothes dryers, and dishwashers.
- wind energy - the kinetic energy present in the motion of the wind. Wind energy can be converted to mechanical or electrical energy. A traditional mechanical windmill can be used for pumping water or grinding grain. A modern electrical wind turbine converts the force of the wind to electrical energy for consumption on-site and/or export to the electricity grid.
- wind turbines – see wind energy.
- work – physical or mental effort; a force exerted for a distance; an energy transformation process which results in a change of concentration or form of energy.

== Z ==
- zero waste – turning waste into resource; the redesign of resource-use so that waste can ultimately be reduced to zero; ensuring that by-products are used elsewhere and goods are recycled, in emulation of the cycling of wastes in nature.

== See also ==
- Environmental science
- Climate change acronyms
- Glossary of climate change
- List of environmental issues
- List of sustainability topics
