= Ethics of climate change =

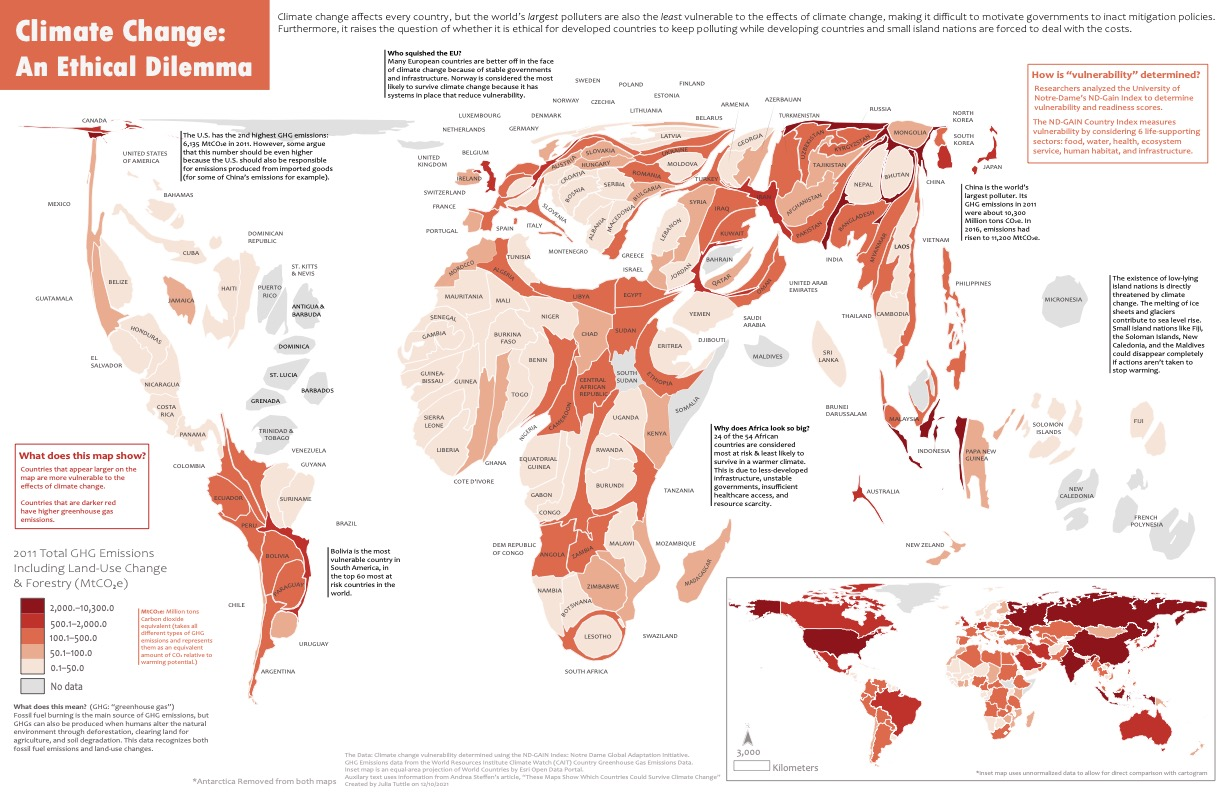
Size corresponds to climate change vulnerability (determined by the University of Notre Dame's ND-Gain Index), with larger countries being more vulnerable. Color corresponds to total GHG emissions, including land-use change (2011), with a darker shade indicating higher emissions.

Climate change ethics explores the moral implications of climate change. Scientists, economists, and policymakers apply neutral values to their study of climate change ethics. Some philosophers, such as Stephen M. Gardiner and the Intergovernmental Panel on Climate Change (IPCC) writers, argue that climate change raises moral issues requiring value-laden judgments.

The two ethical implications of climate change are related to its effects. Anthropogenic climate change is caused mainly by humans burning fossil fuels. The primary beneficiaries of fossil fuel burning are developed countries whereas the majority of climate impacts will be felt by the developing world. Climate change occurs on timescales much greater than a single generation of the human population, causing conflict between economic and political interests which are products of society and the interests of future people. Recent empirical evaluations show that the increasing climatic disruptions are disproportionately affecting the vulnerable groups who have contributed the least towards greenhouse gas emissions on a global scale.

== Background ==
Climate change is a concern for multiple disciplines due to its catastrophic impacts on environmental systems, wildlife, nature, and humans. It poses a serious threat to the global economy as economic development. It has been largely dependent on the extraction and burning of fossil fuels since the Industrial Revolution. Climate change is also a deeply political issue as there are disagreements among actors on whether and to what extent society should act on climate change. Economics is insufficient to guide policymaking alone as it is only capable of making predictions about how different policy decisions will affect the economy. It cannot tell us which path to choose; that is determined by the values we act on as a society. This is why some philosophers have argued that climate change is “fundamentally an ethical issue,” which raises questions about "how we ought to live, what kinds of societies we want, and how we should relate to nature and other forms of life.”

== Global justice ==
Climate change can be considered a global justice issue because the actors with the largest contribution to climate change are not the ones suffering from the most severe impacts. For the most part wealthy, developed nations have emitted, and continue to emit, disproportionally large amounts of greenhouse gases compared to developing nations. Bangladesh is highly vulnerable to the effects of climate change. The country's per capita emissions are 1/20 of the global average and 1/100 of the per capita emissions in the United States, but its topography makes it vulnerable to sea level rise and cyclones, which are predicted to increase in frequency and intensity due to climate change. Cimate change should be seen as a global justice issue because the drivers of the results of climate change (developed nations) and the victims of those impacts (developing nations) are distinct actors.

The global justice issue can be framed in terms of wealth. "Half the world’s carbon is emitted by the world’s richest 500 million people." This means that regardless of where one lives, the higher their income, the higher their emissions. The wealth-emissions relationship also works within specific countries. The United States, for example, has one of the highest per capita greenhouse gas emissions in the world and lower-income people in the U.S. with lower emissions. Poorer people, regardless of where they live, are more likely to experience the effects of climate change because they have a fewer means to adapt compared to wealthy people. According to the IPCC, the cost of cutting carbon emissions would be less than global GDP growth, decreasing by 1.3 to 2.7 percent by 2050.

== Intergenerational ethics ==
Global warming—the progression from cooler historical temperatures (blue) to recent warmer temperatures (red)—is being experienced disproportionately by younger generations.

Successive generations are predicted to experience progressively greater unprecedented lifetime exposure (ULE) events such as heat waves. About 111 million children born in 2020 will live with unprecedented heatwave exposure in a world that warms by 3.5 °C, compared with 62 million with only 1.5 °C of warming.

The intergenerational ethics of climate change refers to the responsibility of current generations to be environmentally conscious to and ensure the sustainable use of resources for future generations. Moral responsibility is a central consideration in intergenerational climate change ethics. This responsibility covers several interests: humans, animals, future people, and nature. The interests of the current generation must be weighed against those of future generations, balancing current needs against future needs.

Climate change and its effects are dispersed temporally and spatially. Ethical implications due to spatial dispersion: those causing the problem are not in the same physical space as those experiencing the worst of its effects. Temporal ethical implications relate to greenhouse gas emissions affecting future generations more than they will affect the current population. This notion of pushing climate change impacts on future people poses epistemic difficulties, complicating a firsthand feeling of cause and effect, which could undermine motivation to respond.

Institutional inadequacy also complicates the issue. Democratic political institutions have short time horizons which are at odds with the timescale of global climate change. Politicians are concerned about voter support for upcoming election cycles, a scale of a few years, where climate change demands longer timescales of hundreds to thousands of years. Quick, problematic fixes tend to be favored over long term, substantial solutions as a result.

== Economics ==
Economists propose prioritizing adaptation over mitigation due to high costs associated with mitigation in spite of the philosophical limitations of conventional economic analyses. Such analyses discount future generations, failing to consider all (future and present) relevant costs and benefits of climate change mitigation. Henry Shrue argues that the "no harm principle" gives us reason for acting on climate change, despite the uncertainty of future impacts.

Temporal discounting in economics is relevant to climate change ethics due to the temporal dispersion of its effects. Economists use discount rates to determine the value of future goods because it is assumed that the global economy will continue to grow and future people will have more goods than current people. The more goods you have, the less valuable any one good is, hence, it is discounted. Using different discount rates, economists can share different conclusions regarding how much of the global budget should be dedicated to climate change mitigation, adaptation, or other expenditures. Prioritarianism offers one ethical justification for imploring a high discount rate; future people will be better off than we are today, benefiting people today is more valuable than benefiting future people. Utilitarianism on the other hand, favors a lower discount rate (or none) under the idea that benefits to future people are equally valuable as benefits to current people.

== Human rights ==
Climate change threatens the basic human rights of individuals and communities globally. It also violates human rights, including the right to life, health, food, water, security, and shelter. Moreover, climate change accelerates existing inequalities, disproportionately affecting vulnerable populations. In ethics, adopting a rights-based approach to climate change that recognizes the link between climate change and human rights would provide a useful framework.

A moral threshold approach to climate change identifies the minimum standards required to ensure that human rights are not violated by climate change. This approach also involves identifying the responsibilities of different actors in addressing climate change across the spectrum: states, corporations, and individuals.

States must take action to address climate change as the primary source of greenhouse gas emissions. Similarly, corporations must reduce their emissions and contribute to sustainable development. Individuals can adopt sustainable lifestyles. They can advocate for policies that address climate change.
