= Polar city =

Polar City
- This is an artist's rendition of a Polar City planned for Longyearbyen. It represents both above and below ground components which contain city infrastructure, residential housing, limited shopping, and agricultural areas.

Additional Information
- Alternate Name: Lovelock Retreat
- Region: Polar region
- Creator: James Lovelock

A polar city is a proposed sustainable polar retreat designed to house human beings in the future, in the event that global warming causes the equatorial and middle latitudes of the Earth to become uninhabitable for a long period of time. Although they have not been built yet, some futurists have been giving considerable thought to the concepts involved. High-population-density cities, to be built near the Arctic Rim and in Antarctica, New Zealand, Tasmania, and Patagonia, with sustainable energy and transportation infrastructure, will require substantial nearby agriculture. Boreal soils are gray soils that are thin acidic and are largely poor in key nutrients like nitrogen and phosphorus, but nitrogen-fixing plants (such as the various alders) with the proper symbiotic microbes and mycorrhizal fungi can likely remedy such poverty without the need for petroleum-derived fertilizers. Regional probiotic soil improvement should perhaps rank high on any polar cities priority list. James Lovelock's notion of a widely distributed almanac of science knowledge and post-industrial survival skills also appears to have value.

== History ==
The polar cities climate retreat living pod concept is a worst-case scenario prediction based on the ideas of British chemist and inventor James Lovelock: life in polar cities arrayed inland and around the shores of an ice-free Arctic Ocean in a greenhouse-warmed world. Dr. Lovelock, who in 1972 conceived of the Earth's crust, climate, and veneer of life as a unified self-sustaining entity, foresees humanity in full pole-bound retreat within a century as areas around the tropics roast — a scenario far outside even the worst-case projections of climate scientists.

After reading a newspaper column in 2006 in which Dr. Lovelock predicted disastrous warming, Danny Bloom, a freelance newspaper reporter and climate blogger, teamed up with Deng Cheng-hong, a Taiwanese artist, and set up websites showing designs for self-sufficient Arctic communities. Mr. Bloom's intent is to conduct a non-threatening thought experiment that might prod people out of their comfort zone on climate change.

== Popular culture ==
In 2012, two books about polar cities were published. Polar City Red, by Jim Laughter, is a climate fiction novel about life in a polar city in the year 2075 in Alaska. Polar City Dreaming: How Climate Change Might Usher In The Age Of Polar Cities, by Stephan Malone, is a nonfiction history of polar city ideas.

== Design ==
The design of polar cities climate retreat living pods is currently (2008) driven entirely by volunteers under the name of "The Polar City Project". Danny Bloom is currently leading this effort. The defining design characteristics are efficiency, both for operational costs as well as construction costs, and a desire for the city to be a Zero energy building. The proposed agricultural module, for example, is a Sustainable agriculture vertical farm.
