= Ecologically sustainable development =

Ecologically sustainable development is the environmental component of sustainable development. It can be achieved partially through the use of the precautionary principle; if there are threats of serious or irreversible environmental damage, lack of full scientific certainty should not be used as a reason for postponing measures to prevent environmental degradation.

Also important is the principle of intergenerational equity; the present generation should ensure that the health, diversity and productivity of the environment is maintained or enhanced for the benefit of future generations. In order for this movement to flourish, environmental factors should be more heavily weighed in the valuation of assets and services to provide more incentive for the conservation of biological diversity and ecological integrity.

== Biodiversity considerations ==
When trying to integrate ecologically sustainable developments into a region, it is important to take biodiversity into consideration before moving forward with developments. Specifically, how a sustainable development impacts the biodiversity of its area and how they can be used to facilitate biodiversity. Recognizing and conserving biodiversity is essential for maintaining the resilience and functionality of ecosystems which humans greatly depend.

Although urbanization can have negative effects on certain flora and fauna species, if urban planning is carried out in a way that does consider biodiversity, some urban areas can provide habitats and foster biodiversity which can be facilitated with the help of ecologically sustainable developments. Cities provide important habitats for many types of plants and fungi and can also act as a refuge for certain animal species as well. This can be assisted even more with the use of ecologically sustainable developments which play a large role in being able to provide habitats for those species. In addition to sustainable developments in cities, green areas, such as parks and open spaces, or green corridors, provide species with food and breeding habitats. Specifically increasing the size of green areas and developing a network of green corridors is a successful way to maintain high levels of urban biodiversity.

An additional aspect that can be influenced by ecologically sustainable developments and is connected to green areas are urban forests. Urban forests have often been included in cities whether through landscapes, parks, or street trees and can affect the biodiversity of a city. Depending on the type of urban forest and the way it is managed, urban forests can provide a space where native tree species are able to thrive and provide strong biodiversity efforts for the city it is in.

A feature that can be included in an ecological sustainable development is a green roof. The incorporation of a green roof on a sustainable development can facilitate urban biodiversity from different types of vegetation that can be installed on a green roof, thus increasing the overall biodiversity of an area. The installation of green roofs can also help improve biodiversity specifically for species that need extra assistance and are not as migratory as other species. They can provide species a safe, natural, undisturbed habitat, depending on the setup and conditions of the green roof/space, where they can develop and grow.

The density and compactness of a city can also affect the biodiversity conditions which influences the types and number of ecologically sustainable developments that should be implemented to meet the goal of increasing biodiversity. It has been studied that if high density urban areas are well managed, they can preserve large intact green spaces and create a more ecologically heterogeneous area that has the ability to support both urban-adapted and urban sensitive species. However, there is a specific critical threshold that most cities have where if residential density reaches that point, all species would decline as there would not be enough vegetation to maintain them.Overall, strategic urban planning with the implementation of ecologically sustainable development and the preservation of green areas and a network of corridors between these areas should be utilized in order to have an efficient use of land. This thus reduces the impact of humans on the city's biodiversity and allows for opportunities for people to interact with the local biodiversity.

== Political considerations ==
Effective political support is necessary for ecologically sustainable development. The mobilization of governments can be translated into action plans that are crucial to sustainable development. Development efforts can be influenced by patterns of family arrangements, work attitudes, social morality—particularly interpersonal responsibilities, hierarchy of authority, quality of scientific education and implementation, and degree of domestic stability—especially, freedom from social conflict. National policy and development planning requires three conditions to permit ecological sustainability: action-oriented values to which individuals are committed, political authorities that favour long-term ecological benefits over immediate economic gains, and a policy with a politically competent constituency.

Canada has taken an evidence based approach to sustainability development by using Environmental Sustainability Indicators as guiding tool for policy development. At the municipal level, many cities also use evidence based indicators and Ecological Indexes as a tools for policy development.

== Forums for ecologically sustainable development ==
The World Conservation Strategy was published in 1980, becoming one of the most encouraging developments that uses a goal-oriented programme for political change concerning ecological sustainability. The publication marked a fundamental policy shift for the global conservation movement. The traditional focus became cure rather than Prevention, confirming the growing trend on the assimilation of preservation and development aims that are key to an ecologically sustainable society. Specifically, the concentration on wildlife conservation drifted into a concern for wider strains degrading the natural environment.

It promotes the principles of sustainable development and addresses the environmental concerns introduced by economic development decisions with a format that targets a wide audience. There are three chief conservation objectives:

1. Maintaining essential biogeochemical cycles and life-support systems
2. Preserving genetic diversity
3. Establishing a sustainable use of species and ecosystems

Other efforts such as the World Campaign for the Biosphere present environmental obstacles constantly before governmental and scientific authorities. Nicholas Polunin, former president of the Foundation for Environmental Conservation, believed the starting point for the World Campaign effort occurred in 1966 at an UNESCO conference in Finland. The conference examined conditions that hinder ecologically sustainable development such as rapid population growth, proliferation of nuclear weapons, and depletion of natural resources. Similarly, the Global 2000 Report to the President, presents environmental prospective conditions that are likely to worsen if public policies, institutions, and rates of technologic advancement do not change. Findings of this type prompted environmentalists and the Foundation for Environmental Conservation to initiate the World Campaign project and have included the following suggestions:

- Publication and broadcast of environmental issues
- Use of traditional communication mediums such as posters and automobile stickers
- Distribution of increasing basic and applied environmental research results
- Information about family planning and the necessity to control population growth
- Designating more area as national parks or wilderness areas, including the ocean
- Organization of local, state, national, and international conferences to discuss environmental issues
- Encouraging sustainable uses of our natural resources
- Establishment of common laws for the Earth and mankind
- Obtaining support form nongovernmental organizations and institutions for the World Campaign
- Attaining recognition such as "Guardians of the Biosphere Awards," for persons and/or groups that demonstrate actions to preserve the environment

== See also ==
- Permaculture
- Greenhouse debt
- Sustainability
- Environmental regeneration
