= Cool tropics paradox =

The cool tropics paradox. The geological evidence appeared to constrain temperatures to the red/blue band, whereas models produced the brown line taking just continental configuration into account, and the blue line when they included increased atmospheric CO_{2}. Vertical axis: Temperature; horizontal:latitude.

The cool tropics paradox is the apparent difference between modeled estimates of tropical temperatures during warm, ice-free periods of the Cretaceous and Eocene, and the colder temperatures which proxies suggested were present. The long-standing paradox was resolved when novel proxy derived temperatures showed significantly warmer tropics during past greenhouse climates. The low-gradient problem, i.e. the very warm polar regions with respect to present day, is still an issue for state-of-the-art climate models.

== Origin of the paradox ==
Proxy-based reconstructions of paleotemperature appeared to predict a low temperature gradient between the tropics and poles. Data from surface-dwelling foraminifera suggested that during the late Cretaceous, an unusually warm period, sea surface temperatures were cooler than today's. The term was later applied to similar situations, for example during the Eocene.

Climate models which worked during the Tertiary failed to produce this low temperature gradient; in order to match the observed data, they predicted that the tropics should be 40 °C or more - much hotter than the proxies said they were, and much hotter than the tropical surface temperatures observed today, which average around 25 °C (77 °F). To attempt to match the data, bizarre models involving unreasonable eddies were required.

=== Models ===
Models were developed to predict and explain the lack of ice during the warm periods of the Cretaceous and Eocene. Models are developed according to the fundamental principle that they should be kept as simple as possible. Consequently, the first models attempted to explain the lack of ice using solely the different continental configuration. These could not produce an ice-free state without using an increased atmospheric concentration of CO_{2}; this assumption was checked against the evidence and found to be valid. This introduced a new difficulty: more CO_{2} would produce warmer tropical sea temperatures, and the evidence suggested they were the same or even colder than today's.

=== Data supporting cool tropical oceans ===
Foraminiferal data, suggesting tropical temperatures cooler than today's, disagreed with terrestrial proxies, which spoke of warmer temperatures - although most of the terrestrial figures are based on extrapolation of data from outside the tropics.

=== Sources of error ===
Analytical error is around 2−3 °C for individual specimens, but this drops to 0.5−1.0 °C when a sample is analysed - not enough to explain the discrepancy. Other factors mean that any pristine sample can be considered to have an associated error of up to 3 °C. Changes in salinity, kinetic and diagenesis, can also confound analysis: the latter two are each estimated to reduce estimated temperatures by 1−2 °C, and are difficult to quantify.

=== Reconciling the data with the model ===
The only way the model could be "tweaked" was by changing the parameterisation of clouds, one of the most unpredictable aspects of any model. The model was adjusted to assume that the higher CO_{2} levels produced more tropical cloud-cover, shielding these regions from the sun's heat. However, there was no evidence for this behaviour, and still left problems. The poles were still warmer than the models predicted. Other feedbacks, including increased poleward heat transport by the oceans, and vegetational responses at high latitudes, were proposed, but these did not fully explain behaviour in the southern hemisphere, and winter, respectively.

== Unravelling the paradox ==
=== Hints of warmth - terrestrial proxies ===
Data from terrestrial proxies suggested that the equator may have reached 30 °C - however, this figure is based upon extrapolation of data found outside the tropics. This would imply that the foraminiferal proxies were wrong - the tests may perhaps have been overprinted by diagenesis. Researchers turned to shallow marine molluscs as it is easy to determine whether their shells had been altered by diagenesis.

=== Detecting diagenesis in molluscs ===
Many mollusc shells are constructed from aragonite, a mineral that is quickly replaced by calcite by diagenetic alteration. Also, near-shore molluscs preserve seasonal variability in their shells, a feature that would be lost in the presence of a diagenetic signal. This removes ambiguity about whether or not a shell has been affected by post-deposition processes.

=== Data from molluscs ===
Evidence from the molluscs suggested a cooling between the Eocene and Oligocene. Taken from the Mississippi embayment, they recorded temperatures of around 26 °C in the Eocene, and 22 °C in the Oligocene; this cooling was markedly seasonal, with reconstructed water temperatures being 5° cooler in the summer, but just 3° cooler in winter. This trend fits best if CO_{2} was the dominant force for cooling.

The winter temperatures of molluscs match well with the foraminiferal temperatures, suggesting that foraminifera predominantly grew during the winter months. The overall temperatures corresponded well with terrestrial and modelled estimates of a sea surface temperature around 4–5° warmer than today's.

=== Reassessment of the foraminiferal record ===
The magnesium/calcium paleothermometer is a recently developed alternative to the δ^{18}O method, and avoids many of the uncertainties inherent in the latter method. Use of this technique generates results more consistent with those expected, in contrast to the original δ^{18}O records from the same sites. Further painstaking studies targeted solely those foraminifera which could be demonstrated not to have undergone any diagenesis in fact give a δ^{18}O signature similar to that expected, suggesting that poor preservation was responsible for the original confusion.
