= Greenhouse debt =

Greenhouse debt is a concept, put forward by Friends of the Earth and similar organisations, to measure the extent to which an individual person, incorporated association, business enterprise, government instrumentality or / [and] (per Neb., USA) geographic community exceeds its "permitted" greenhouse footprint and emits greenhouse gases that contribute to global warming and climate change.

Some governments, at least the Australian Labor leadership, have a tendency to accept such a line of reasoning. The concept, however, makes no sense without a clear numerical value for the permitted greenhouse footprint, which is not easily defined or estimated.

The greenhouse debt assessment thus forms an ecological footprint analysis, but can be used separately. Taken conjointly with a 'water debt' analysis and an ecological impact assessment, greenhouse debt analysis is basic to giving individuals, organisations, governments and communities an understanding of the effects they are having on Gaia, life, and global warming.

Those promoting the idea assert that ensuring that the greenhouse debt is zero is essential towards achieving ecologically sustainable development or a sustainable retreat. Any greenhouse debt incurred will contribute to making life harder for future generations of humans and non-human lifeforms.

There are three possible consequences that occur as a result of a greenhouse debt.

1. Mitigation: finding compensatory ways of reducing the greenhouse debt so its effects are neutralised
2. Adaptation: finding ways of adjusting to the resulting global warming or climate change
3. Suffering: having one's quality of life reduced as a result of the consequences

== See also ==
- Ecological debt
- Ecological deficit
- Ecological footprint
