= Stephen M. Gardiner =

American philosopher

- Born: 1967 (age 58–59)

Education
- Education: University of Oxford (B.A. in Philosophy, Politics and Economics) University of Colorado (M.A. in Philosophy) Cornell University (Ph.D. in Philosophy)
- Thesis: Agent-Centered Eudaimonism and the Virtues: Some Groundwork for a NeoAristotelian Metaphysics of Morals (1999)
- Doctoral advisor: Terence Irwin

Philosophical work
- Era: 21st-century philosophy
- Region: Western philosophy
- Institutions: University of Washington
- Main interests: Applied ethics, climate change, environment, ethics, future generations, classical Greek, human rights, moral philosophy, political philosophy, climate policy, virtue ethics
- Website: http://faculty.washington.edu/smgard/wordpress/

Stephen M. Gardiner (born 1967) is an American philosopher and Professor of Philosophy and Ben Rabinowitz Endowed Professor of Human Dimensions of the Environment at the University of Washington. He is known for his works on environmental philosophy and ancient Greek philosophy.

== Books ==
- Dialogues on Climate Justice, Routledge, 2023
- The Ethics of “Geoengineering” the Global Climate: Justice, Legitimacy and Governance, Routledge, 2021
- Oxford Handbook of Intergenerational Ethics, Oxford University Press, 2021
- Debating Climate Ethics, Oxford University Press, 2016
- Oxford Handbook of Environmental Ethics, Oxford University Press, 2016
- A Perfect Moral Storm, Oxford University Press, 2011
- Climate Ethics: Essential Readings, Oxford University Press, 2010
- Virtue Ethics, Old and New, Cornell University Press, 2005
