= Sustainable tourism =

Form of travel and tourism without damage to nature or cultural area

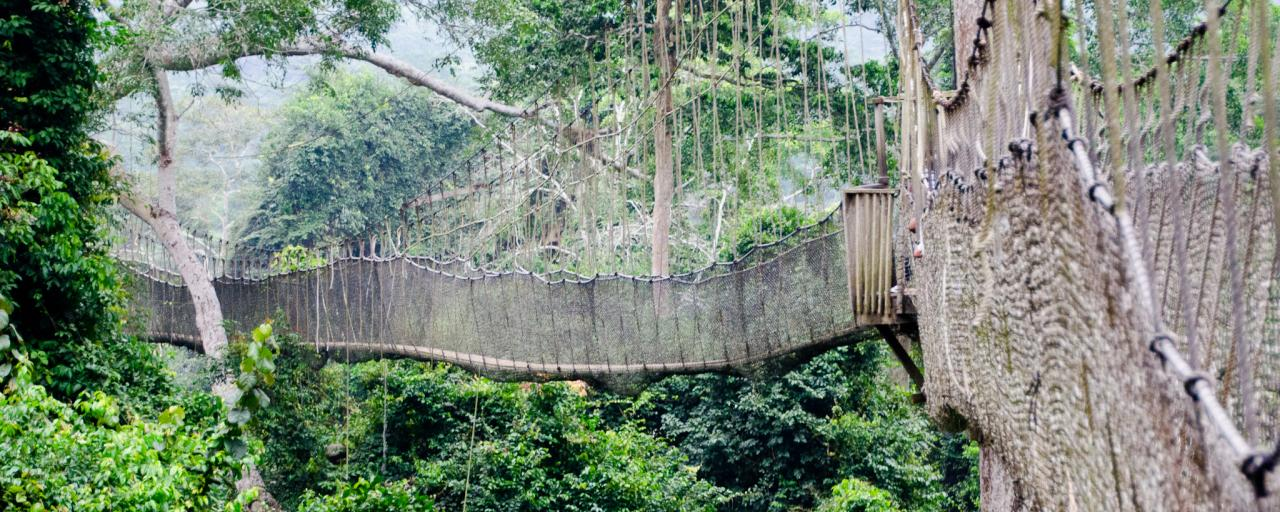
A canopy walkway at Kakum National Park in Ghana, ensuring that tourists have least direct impact on the surrounding ecology. The visitor park received the Global Tourism for Tomorrow Award in 1998.

Sustainable tourism is a concept that covers the complete tourism experience, including concern for economic, social, and environmental issues as well as attention to improving tourists' experiences and addressing the needs of host communities. Sustainable tourism should embrace concerns for environmental protection, social equity, and the quality of life, cultural diversity, and a dynamic, viable economy delivering jobs and prosperity for all. It has its roots in sustainable development and there can be some confusion as to what "sustainable tourism" means. There is now broad consensus that tourism should be sustainable. In fact, all forms of tourism have the potential to be sustainable if planned, developed and managed properly. Tourist development organizations are promoting sustainable tourism practices in order to mitigate negative effects caused by the growing impact of tourism, for example its environmental impacts.

The United Nations World Tourism Organization emphasized these practices by promoting sustainable tourism as part of the Sustainable Development Goals, through programs like the International Year for Sustainable Tourism for Development in 2017. There is a direct link between sustainable tourism and several of the 17 Sustainable Development Goals (SDGs). Tourism for SDGs focuses on how SDG 8 ("decent work and economic growth"), SDG 12 ("responsible consumption and production") and SDG 14 ("life below water") implicate tourism in creating a sustainable economy.

According to the World Travel & Tourism Council (WTTC), tourism accounted for 10.3% of global GDP in 2019, with 1.5 billion international arrivals and US $1.7 trillion in export earnings. Improvements are expected to be gained through better management aspects and by integrating sustainable tourism into a broader sustainable development strategy.

== Definition ==
Sustainable tourism is "an exceedingly complex concept with varied definitions due to different interpretations of the meaning and use of the concept". It has its roots in sustainable development, a term that is "open to wide interpretation". This can lead to some confusion as to what sustainable tourism means.

A definition of sustainable tourism from 2020 is: "Tourism which is developed and maintained in an area in such a manner and at such a scale that it remains viable over an infinite period while safeguarding the Earth's life support system on which the welfare of current and future generations depends."

Sustainable tourism covers the complete tourism experience, including concern for economic, social and environmental issues as well as attention to improving tourists' experiences. The concept of sustainable tourism aims to reduce the negative effects of tourism activities. This has become almost universally accepted as a desirable and politically appropriate approach to tourism development.

== Background ==
=== Global goals ===
The United Nations World Tourism Organization (UNWTO), is the custodian agency to monitor the targets of Sustainable Development Goal 8 ("decent work and economic growth") that are related to tourism. The Sustainable Development Goals (SDGs) or Global Goals are a collection of 17 interlinked global goals designed to be a "blueprint to achieve a better and more sustainable future for all". Given the dramatic increase in tourism, the report strongly promotes responsible tourism. Even though some countries and sectors in the industry are creating initiatives for tourism in addressing the SDGs, knowledge sharing, finance and policy for sustainable tourism are not fully addressing the needs of stakeholders.

The SDGs include targets on tourism and sustainable tourism in several goals:

- Target 8.9 of SDG 8 (Decent work and economic growth) states: "By 2030, devise and implement policies to promote sustainable tourism that creates jobs and promotes local culture and products".
- Target 12.a of SDG 12 (responsible consumption and production) is formulated as "Develop and implement tools to monitor sustainable development impacts for sustainable tourism that creates jobs and promotes local culture and products." UNWTO is the custodian agency for this target.
- Target 14.7 of SDG 14 (Life below Water) is to: "By 2030, increase the economic benefits to small island developing States and least developed countries from the sustainable use of marine resources, including through sustainable management of fisheries, aquaculture and tourism".

=== Comparison with conventional tourism and mass tourism ===
According to the UNWTO, "Tourism comprises the activities of persons traveling to and staying in places outside their usual environment for not more than one consecutive year for leisure, business and other purposes." Global economists forecast continuing international tourism growth, the amount depending on the location. As one of the world's largest and fastest-growing industries, this continuous growth will place great stress on remaining biologically diverse habitats and Indigenous cultures. By educating tourists, indigenous communities can foster a newfound appreciation toward their "country's natural, cultural, or historical uniqueness" (Cohan, 1978). Overall, tourists are motivated to learn more, and in return, this can 'help to shape the self-image of the natives" (Cohan, 1978). Meaning, the natives that live on these indigenous lands can better understand their own history while simultaneously educating foreigners. The comparison between tourism in remote locations versus tourism in more developed areas raises a few key differences. Conventional tourism that takes place in more established locations often has thorough infrastructure to accommodate the needs of tourists, whereas remote locations most likely would not have upscale infrastructure. For example, "new airstrips and hotels" are being constructed at an ever-growing rate.

Therefore, in an effort to compare and bring mass tourism to the remotest islands, remote regions will accommodate and meet the needs of guests by developing these facilities. However, changes to the environment may occur for a variety of reasons. For instance, drastic changes may be made because of evolving generational differences and changing socio-political structures. Mass tourism is the organized movement of large numbers of tourists to popular destinations such as theme parks, national parks, beaches or cruise ships. Mass tourism uses standardized packaged leisure products and experiences packaged to accommodate large number of tourists at the same time.

== Related similar concepts ==
=== Responsible tourism ===
While "sustainable tourism" is a concept, the term "responsible tourism" refers to the behaviors and practices that can lead to sustainable tourism. For example, backpacker tourism is a trend that contributes to sustainability from the various environmental, economic, and cultural activities associated with it. All stakeholders are responsible for the kind of tourism they develop or engage in. Both service providers and purchasers or consumers are held accountable. Being responsible demands "thinking" by using planning and development frameworks that are properly grounded in ethical thinking around what is good and right for communities, the natural world and tourists.

According to the Center for Responsible Tourism, responsible tourism is "tourism that maximizes the benefits to local communities, minimizes negative social or environmental impacts, and helps local people conserve fragile cultures and habitats or species." Responsible tourism incorporates not only being responsible for interactions with the physical environment, but also of the economic and social interactions. While different groups will see responsibility in different ways, the shared understanding is that responsible tourism should entail improvements in tourism. This would include ethical thinking around what is "good" and "right" for local communities and the natural world, as well as for tourists. Responsible tourism is an aspiration that can be realized in different ways in different originating markets and in the diverse destinations of the world.

Responsible tourism has also been critiqued. Studies have shown that the degree to which individuals engage in responsible tourism is contingent upon their engagement socially. Meaning, tourist behaviors will fluctuate depending on the range of social engagement that each tourist chooses to take part in. A study regarding responsible tourists behavior concludes that it is not only a personal behavior of tourists that shape outcomes, but also a reflection of mechanisms put in place by governments. Other research has put into question the promise that tourism, even responsible tourism, is inline with UN Sustainable Development Goals given the difficulties in measuring such impact. Some argue that it actually detracts attention from the wider issues surrounding tourism that are in need of regulation, such as the number of visitors and environmental impact.

=== Ecotourism ===
Ecotourism is a form of nature-oriented tourism intended to contribute to the conservation of the natural environment, generally defined as being minimally impactful, and contributing to both conservation and environmental education. The definition sometimes also includes being financially beneficial to the host community or making conservation financially possible. There is a range of different definitions, and the correct definition of the term was an active subject of debate as of 2009. The term is also used more widely by many organizations offering nature tourism, which do not focus on being beneficial to the environment.

=== Nature Positive Tourism ===
Nature positive tourism recognises that tourism should do more than leave no trace. It should leave behind positive benefits for the natural world. A form of regenerative tourism, nature positive tourism is a way for the tourism industry to address the global biodiversity crisis by committing to a nature-positive approach. This requires change across the sector to arrest and reverse declines in nature by 2030, and to achieve full recovery by 2050.

The premise of nature positive tourism rests on the principle that all types of tourism – mainstream or otherwise – rely on nature and impact on it too. According to the World Travel and Tourism Council, 80% of good and services in the industry are highly dependent on nature. The impacts of tourism on nature span all five of the key drivers of global biodiversity loss – land use change, pollution, climate change, over-exploitation of natural resources, and the invasion of non-native species.

Nature positive tourism recognises and addresses these impacts and takes steps to ensure any tourism activities protect and restore natural biodiversity. This could be through supporting reforestation or regeneration initiatives, making space for nature in urban hotels, or changing operating procedures to eradicate light and water pollution.

To promote the adoption of a Nature Positive approach within the industry by 2030, the Nature Positive Tourism Partnership (NPTP) was launched by the UN World Tourism Organisation with the World Travel & Tourism Council (WTTC) and the Sustainable Hospitality Alliance, following COP15. More broadly, the partnership aims to support the implementation of the Global Biodiversity Framework, an agreement that aligns closely with the principles of the nature-positive goal.

Since it was launched, nearly 150 organisations have shown support for the NPTP. A report ('Nature Positive Travel & Tourism in Action') was published in April 2024 to describe the partnership's plan to work towards the nature-positive goal. Some of the priority actions suggested include identifying impacts on biodiversity by assessing operations, setting SMART targets (specific, measurable, assignable, realistic, and time-bound), and stopping animal exploitation. This followed an earlier report by the WTTC in 2022, just before COP15, that launched its nature-positive travel initiative.

== Criticism ==
Although people seek solutions for sustainable tourism, there is no desirable change in the tourism system. Sustainable models must be able to adapt to new challenges a face a wider form of societal transformations. Many critics view the extractive nature of "sustainable tourism" as an oxymoron, as it is fundamentally unable to continue indefinitely. True and perfect sustainability is likely impossible in all but the most favorable circumstances, as the interests of equity, economy, and ecology often conflict with one another and require tradeoffs. It is a reality that many things are done in the name of sustainability are actually masking the desire to allow extra profits. There is often alienation of local populations from the tourists. Such cases highlight that sustainable tourism covers a wide spectrum from "very weak" to "very strong" when the degree of anthropocentrism and exploitation of human and natural resources is taken into account.

== Stakeholders ==
Stakeholders of sustainable tourism can include organizations as well as individuals. A stakeholder in the tourism industry is deemed to be anyone who is impacted by development positively or negatively. Stakeholder involvement reduces potential conflict between the tourists and host community by involving the latter in shaping the way in which tourism develops.

=== Governments and good governance ===
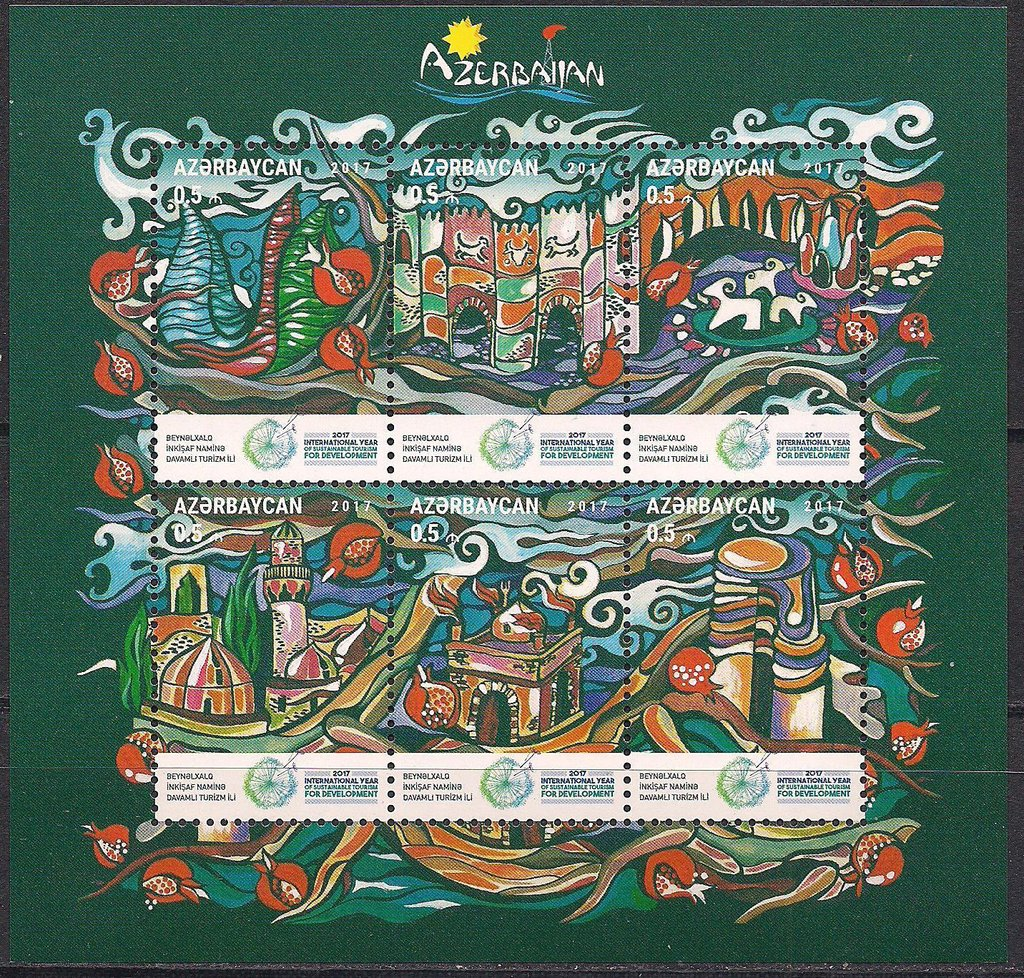
A 2017 stamp by the Government of Azerbaijan celebrating the International Year for Sustainable Tourism in 2017.

The government plays an important role in encouraging sustainable tourism whether it be through marketing, information services, education, and advice through public-private collaborations. However, the values and ulterior motives of governments often need to be taken into account when assessing the motives for sustainable tourism. One important factor to consider in any ecologically sensitive or remote area or an area new to tourism is that of carrying capacity. This is the capacity of tourists of visitors an area can sustainably tolerate over time without damaging the environment or culture of the surrounding area. This can be altered and revised in time and with changing perceptions and values.

Scholars have pointed out that partnerships "incrementally nudge governance towards greater inclusion of diverse stakeholders". Partnerships refer to cooperation between private, public and civil society actors. Its purpose is to implement sustainability policies. Governance is essential in developing partnership initiatives.

Good governance principles for National Parks and protected areas management include legitimacy and voice, direction, performance, accountability and fairness.

=== Non-governmental organizations ===
Non-governmental organizations are one of the stakeholders in advocating sustainable tourism. Their roles can range from spearheading sustainable tourism practices to simply doing research. University research teams and scientists can be tapped to aid in the process of planning. Such solicitation of research can be observed in the planning of Cát Bà National Park in Vietnam.

Dive resort operators in Bunaken National Park, Indonesia, play a crucial role by developing exclusive zones for diving and fishing respectively, such that both tourists and locals can benefit from the venture.

Large conventions, meetings and other major organized events drive the travel, tourism, and hospitality industry. Cities and convention centers compete to attract such commerce, commerce which has heavy impacts on resource use and the environment. Major sporting events, such as the Olympic Games, present special problems regarding environmental burdens and degradation. But burdens imposed by the regular convention industry can be vastly more significant.

Green conventions and events are a new but growing sector and marketing point within the convention and hospitality industry. More environmentally aware organizations, corporations, and government agencies are now seeking more sustainable event practices, greener hotels, restaurants and convention venues, and more energy-efficient or climate-neutral travel and ground transportation. However, the convention trip not taken can be the most sustainable option: "With most international conferences having hundreds if not thousands of participants, and the bulk of these usually traveling by plane, conference travel is an area where significant reductions in air-travel-related GHG emissions could be made. ... This does not mean non-attendance", since modern Internet communications are now ubiquitous and remote audio/visual participation. For example, by 2003 Access Grid technology had already successfully hosted several international conferences. A particular example is the large American Geophysical Union's annual meeting, which has used live streaming for several years. This provides live streams and recordings of keynotes, named lectures, and oral sessions, and provides opportunities to submit questions and interact with authors and peers. Following the live stream, the recording of each session is posted online within 24 hours.

Some convention centers have begun to take direct action in reducing the impact of the conventions they host. One example is the Moscone Center in San Francisco, which has a very aggressive recycling program, a large solar power system, and other programs aimed at reducing impact and increasing efficiency.

=== Local communities ===
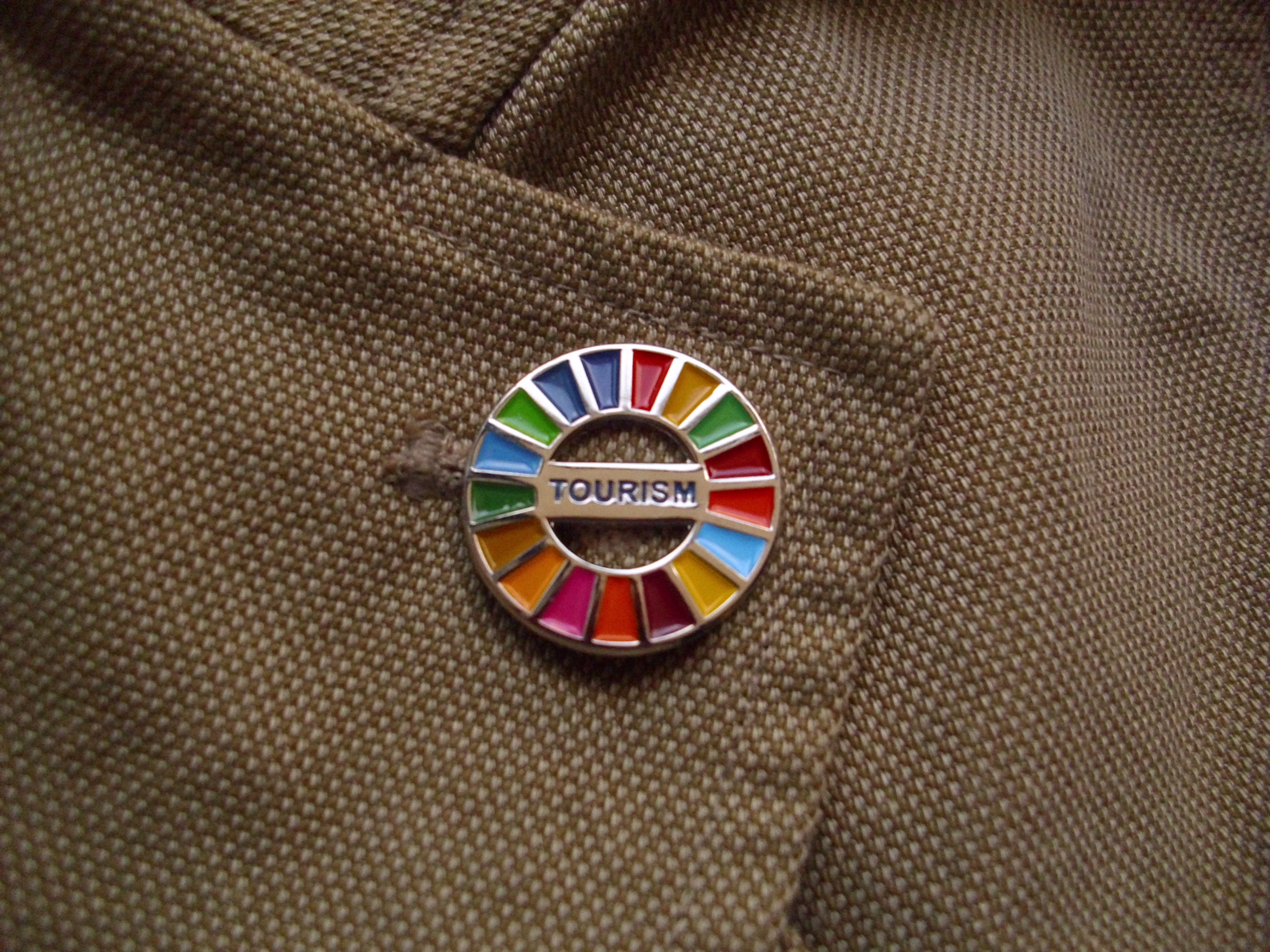
A Sustainable Tourism badge featuring the logo of the Sustainable Development Goals from the World Tourism Organization.

Local communities benefit from sustainable tourism through economic development, job creation, and infrastructure development. Tourism revenues bring economic growth and prosperity to attractive tourist destinations, which can raise the standard of living in destination communities. Sustainable tourism operators commit themselves to creating jobs for local community members. An increase in tourism revenue to an area acts as a driver for the development of increased infrastructure. As tourist demands increase in a destination, a more robust infrastructure is needed to support the needs of both the tourism industry and the local community.

A 2009 study of rural operators throughout the province of British Columbia, Canada found "an overall strong 'pro-sustainability' attitude among respondents. Dominant barriers identified were lack of available money to invest, lack of incentive programs, other business priorities, and limited access to suppliers of sustainable products, with the most common recommendation being the need for incentive programs to encourage businesses to become more sustainable."

=== International organizations ===
The Global Sustainable Tourism Council (GSTC) serves as the international body for fostering increased knowledge and understanding of sustainable tourism practices, promoting the adoption of universal sustainable tourism principles, and building demand for sustainable travel. GSTC launched the GSTC Criteria, a global standard for sustainable travel and tourism, which includes criteria and performance indicators for destinations, tour operators and hotels. The GSTC Criteria serve as the international standard for certification agencies (the organizations that would inspect a tourism product, and certify them as a sustainable company). The GSTC Criteria has the potential to be applied to national parks to improve the standards of operation and increase sustainability efforts in the United States.

== Sustainable transport and mobility ==
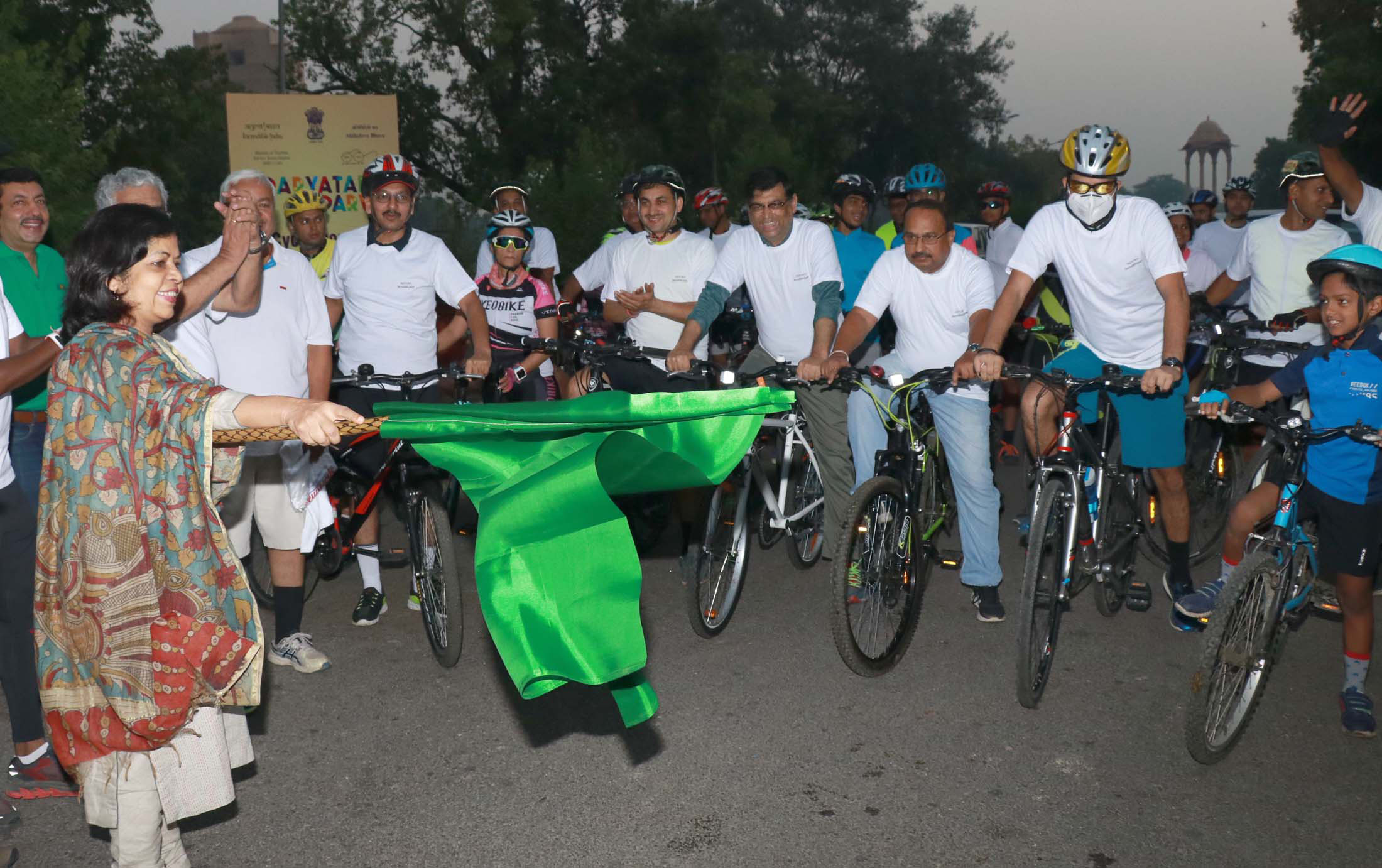
The Secretary, Ministry of Culture and Tourism, Smt. Rashmi Verma flagging off a "Cycle Rally" to create awareness about Tourism, Environment and Sustainability, at India Gate, in New Delhi on October 05, 2017.

Tourism can be related to travel for leisure, business and visiting friends and relatives and can also include means of transportation related to tourism. Without travel there is no tourism, so the concept of sustainable tourism is tightly linked to a concept of sustainable transport. Two relevant considerations are tourism's reliance on fossil fuels and tourism's effect on climate change. A 2024 review of sustainable tourism research found that most studies focus on destinations rather than the transport systems that generate the majority of emissions. The authors argue that sustainable tourism cannot be achieved without addressing origin-to-destination travel and integrating transport planning, geography, and emission data into tourism research and policy frameworks. 72 percent of tourism's CO_{2} emissions come from transportation, 24 percent from accommodations, and 4 percent from local activities. Aviation accounts for 55% of those transportation CO_{2} emissions (or 40% of tourism's total). However, when considering the impact of all greenhouse gas emissions, of condensation trails and induced cirrus clouds, aviation alone could account for up to 75% of tourism's climate impact.

The International Air Transport Association (IATA) considers an annual increase in aviation fuel efficiency of 2 percent per year through 2050 to be realistic. However, both Airbus and Boeing expect the passenger-kilometers of air transport to increase by about 5 percent yearly through at least 2020, overwhelming any efficiency gains. By 2050, with other economic sectors having greatly reduced their CO_{2} emissions, tourism is likely to be generating 40 percent of global carbon emissions. The main cause is an increase in the average distance traveled by tourists, which for many years has been increasing at a faster rate than the number of trips taken. "Sustainable transportation is now established as the critical issue confronting a global tourism industry that is palpably unsustainable, and aviation lies at the heart of this issue."

The European Tourism Manifesto has also called for an acceleration in the development of cycling infrastructure to boost local clean energy travel. Deployment of non-motorized infrastructures and the re-use of abandoned transport infrastructure (such as disused railways) for cycling and walking has been proposed. Connectivity between these non-motorized routes (greenways, cycle routes) and main attractions nearby (i.e. Natura2000 sites, UNESCO sites, etc.) has also been requested. It has also called for sufficient and predictable rail infrastructure funding, and a focus on digital multimodal practices, including end-to-end ticketing (such as Interrail), all of which are in-line with the EU's modal shift goal.

Global tourism accounts for about eight percent of global greenhouse gas emissions. This percentage takes into account airline transportation as well as other significant environmental and social impacts that are not always beneficial to local communities and their economies.

== Challenges ==
=== Displacement and resettlement ===
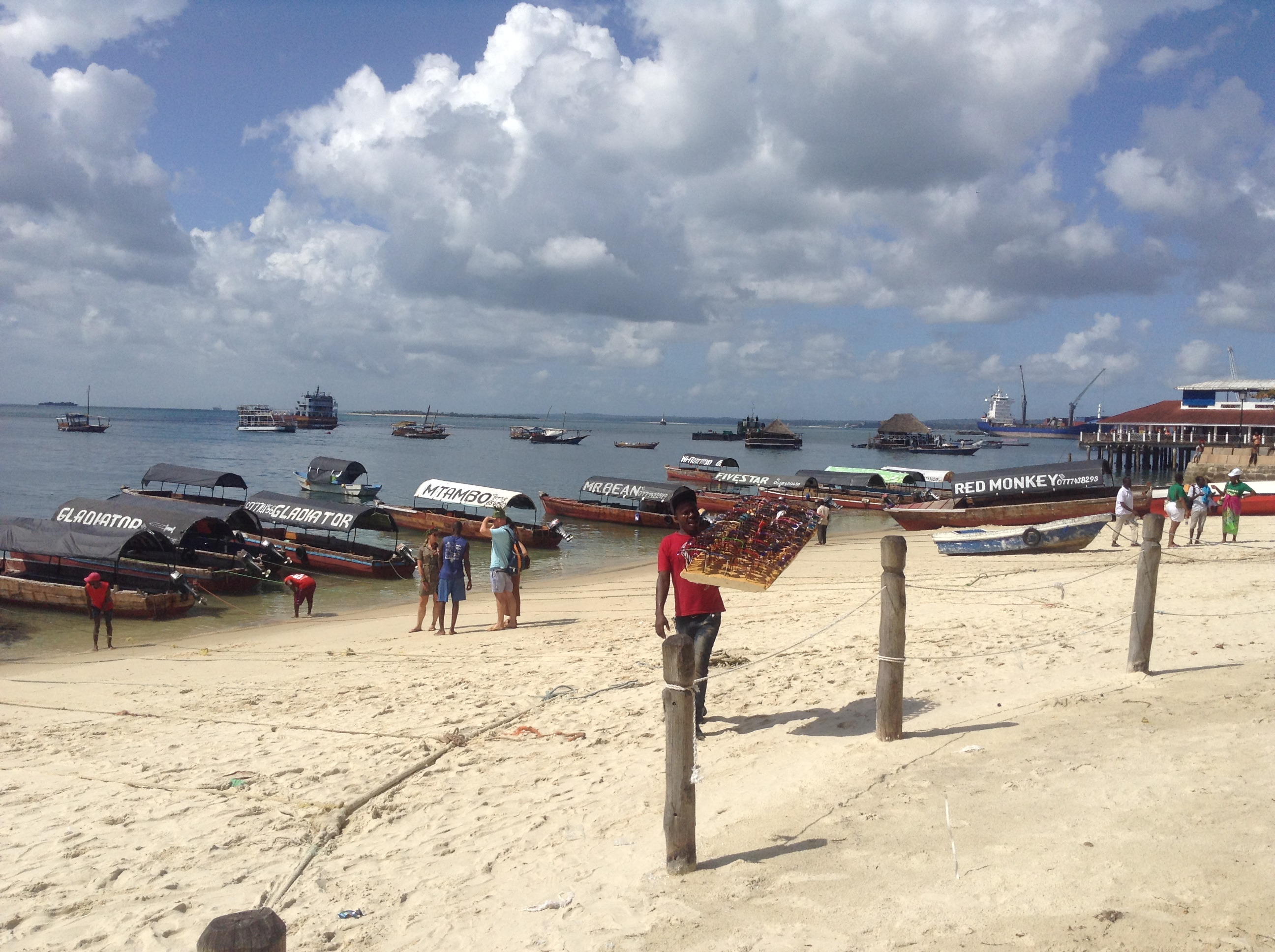
A beach in Zanzibar transformed into a transportation hub catering towards tourists, with vendors like the one in the foreground, selling goods mostly for tourists. Tourism frequently displaces local communities from access to natural resources in favor of tourist industry needs.

In places where there was no tourism prior to tourism companies' arrival, displacement and resettlement of local communities is a common issue. For example, the Maasai tribes in Tanzania have been a victim of this problem. After the second World War, conservationists moved into the areas where the Maasai tribes lived, with the intent to make such areas accessible to tourists and to preserve the areas' natural beauty and ecology. This was often achieved through establishing national parks and conservation areas. It has been claimed that Maasai activities did not threaten the wildlife and the knowledge was blurred by "colonial disdain" and misunderstandings of savannah wildlife. As the Maasai have been displaced, the area within the Ngorongoro Conservation Area (NCA) has been adapted to allow easier access for tourists through the construction of campsites and tracks, as well as the removal of stone objects such as stones for souvenirs.

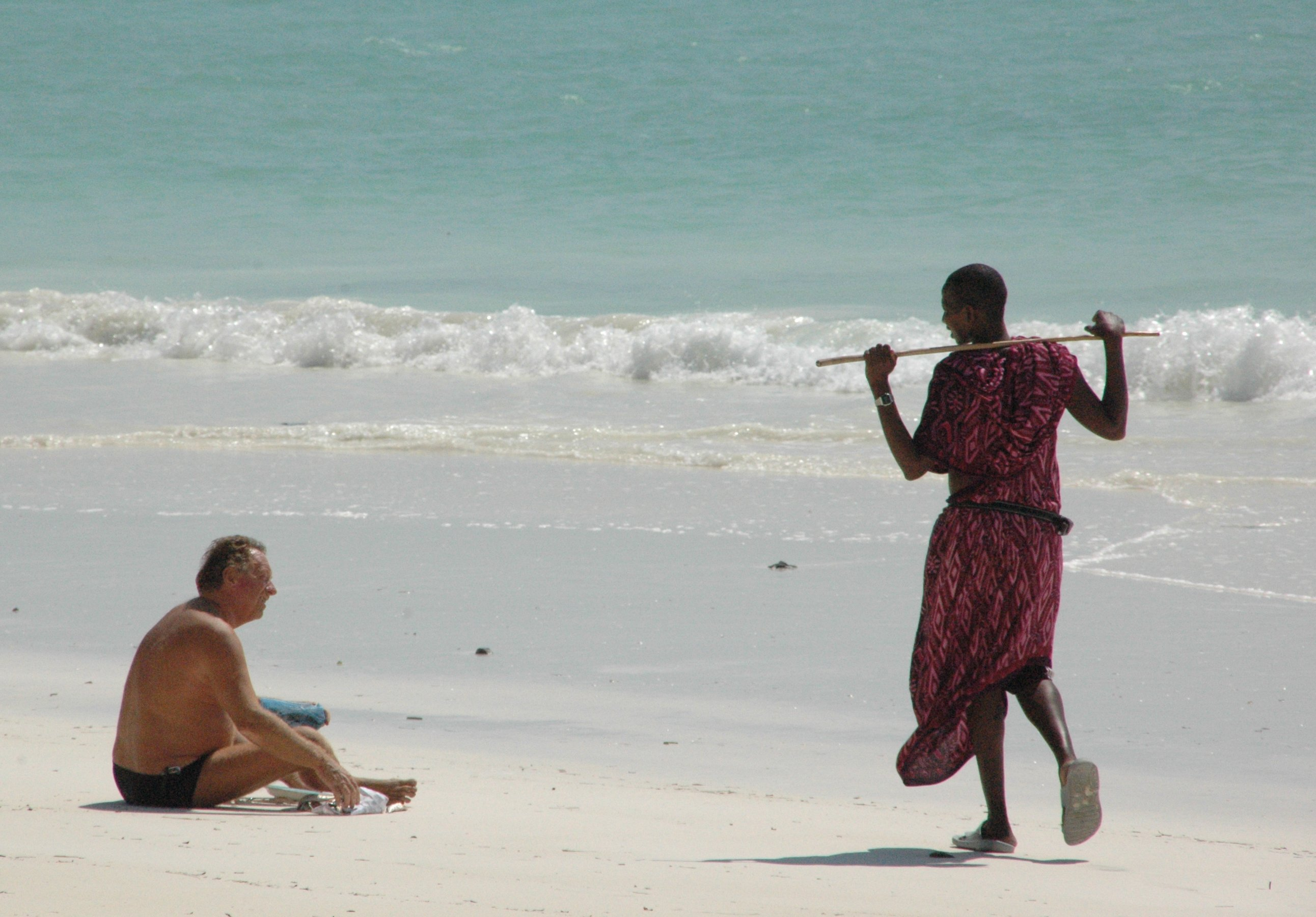
Man dressed in traditional Maasai attire approaching a Tourist on the beach. Thousands of Maasai men have migrated to join the tourism industry on the island and using their ethnic dress to sell goods and services, including sexwork. In the process they have displaced local communities.

=== Environmental impacts ===
Ecotourism, nature tourism, wildlife tourism, and adventure tourism take place in environments such as rain forests, high alpine, wilderness, lakes and rivers, coastlines and marine environments, as well as rural villages and coastline resorts. Peoples' desire for more authentic and challenging experiences results in their destinations becoming more remote, to the few remaining pristine and natural environments left on the planet. The positive impact of this can be an increased awareness of environmental stewardship. The negative impact can be a destruction of the very experience that people are seeking. There are direct and indirect impacts, immediate and long-term impacts, and there are impacts that are both proximal and distal to the tourist destination. These impacts can be separated into three categories: facility impacts, tourist activities, and the transit effect.

Environmental sustainability focuses on the overall viability and health of ecological systems. Natural resource degradation, pollution, and loss of biodiversity are detrimental because they increase vulnerability, undermine system health, and reduce resilience. More research is needed to assess the impacts of tourism on natural capital and ecosystem services. Interdisciplinary and transdisciplinary research is needed to address how the tourism industry impacts waste and wastewater treatment, pollination, food security, raw materials, genetic resources, oil and natural gas regulation and ecosystem functions such as soil retention and nutrient recycling.

When it comes to tourism, the desire to visit more remote locations is a growing trend. Specifically, these undeveloped lands are being prized as scarce resources that are attractive for nature-based tourism. The natural environments are seen as a highly valued locations for tourists due to their naturally challenging terrain. The large impact that tourism has on remote locations results in a great deal of destruction to the environment. Due to the influx of visitors, natural habitats deteriorate, biodiversity is lost, and overall climate change has increased. The permanent destruction of these natural lands has increased due to tourists seeking more adventurous experiences, such as places where they feel challenged by the change of scenery and lifestyles. Therefore, the desire to explore challenging locations, along with the need to experience authentic cultures, drives tourists to remote travel destinations. Which in turn, decreases the number of natural destinations.

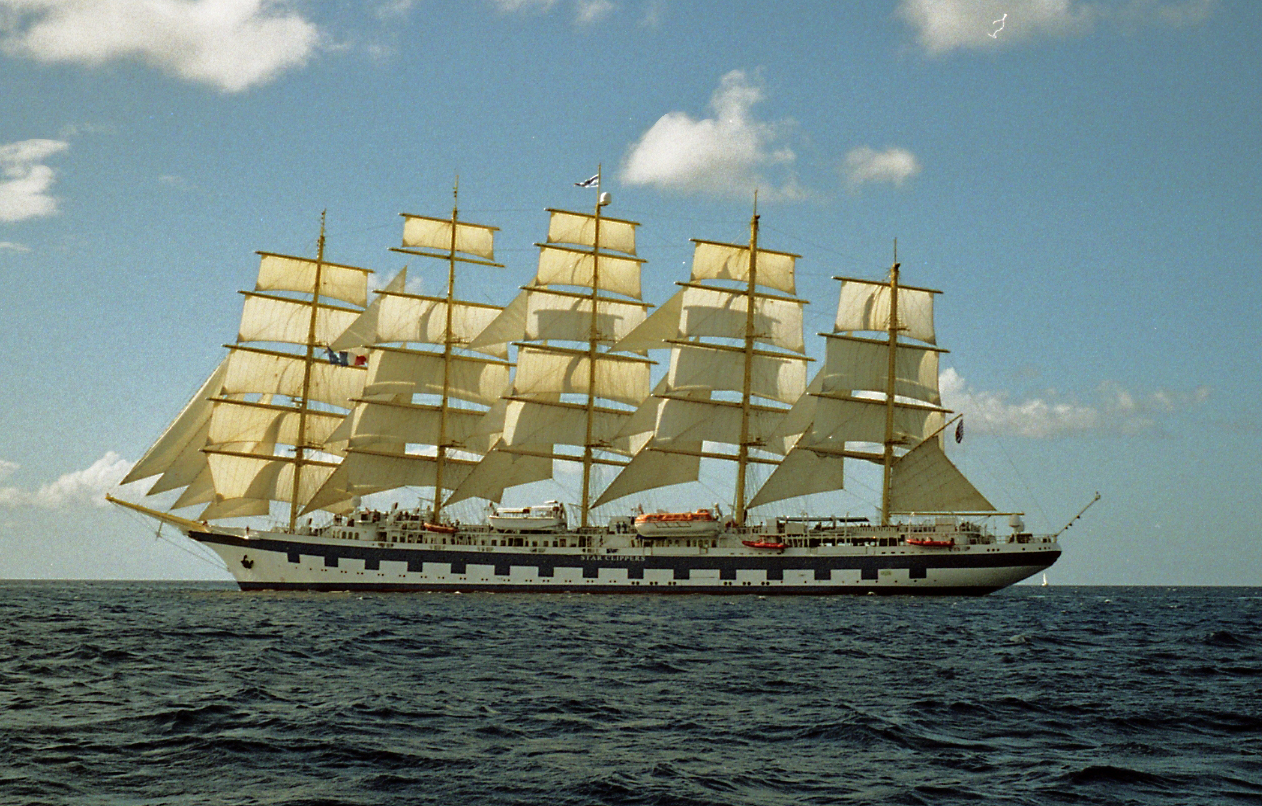
2001 Royal Clipper Karibik is a sail boat that uses the wind to propel itself forward, thereby causing fewer greenhouse gas emissions and less air pollution than ships using fossil energy sources.

== Improvements ==
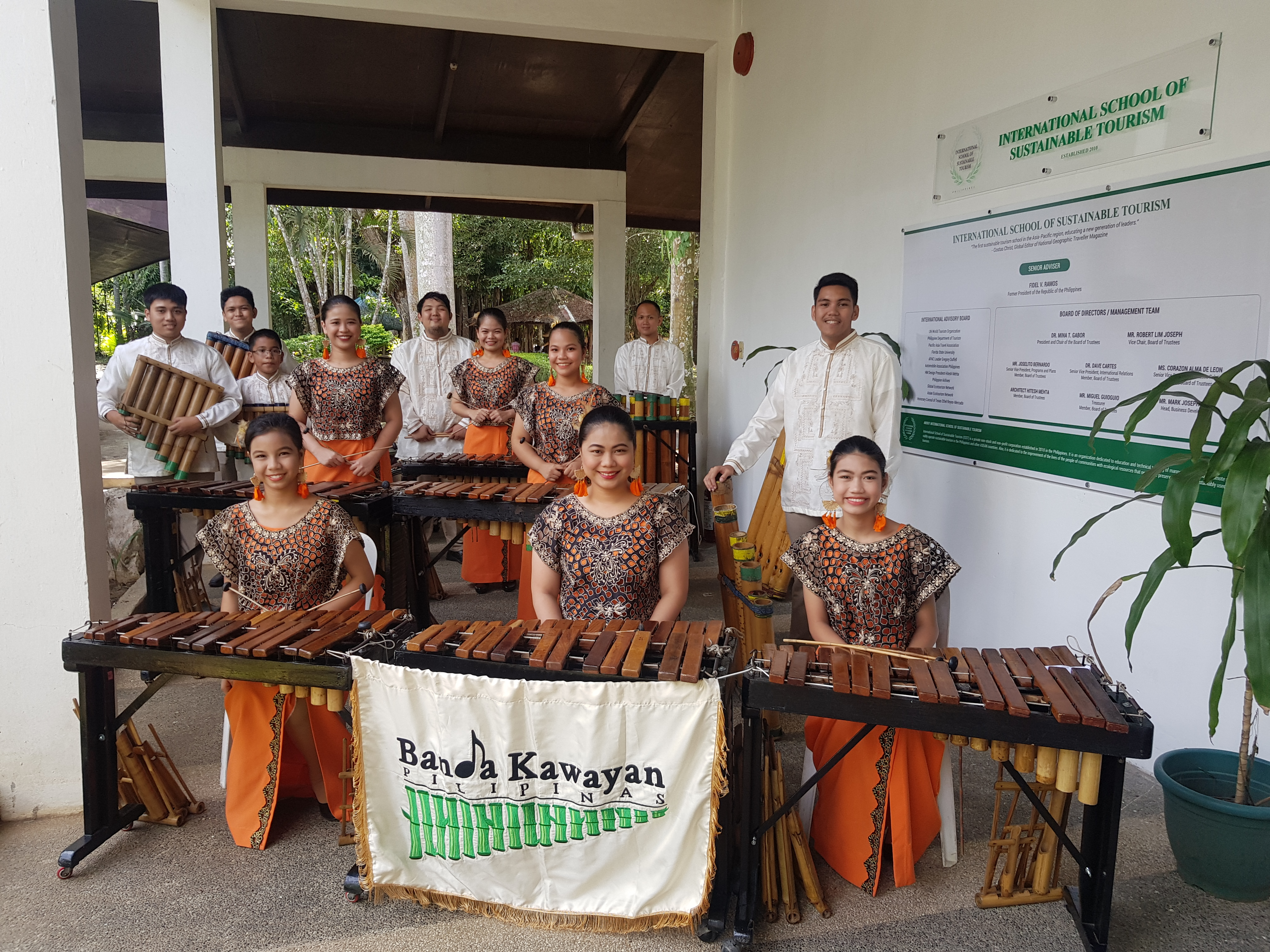
Banda Kawayan Pilipinas, a bamboo orchestra, at the International School of Sustainable Tourism in the Philippines.

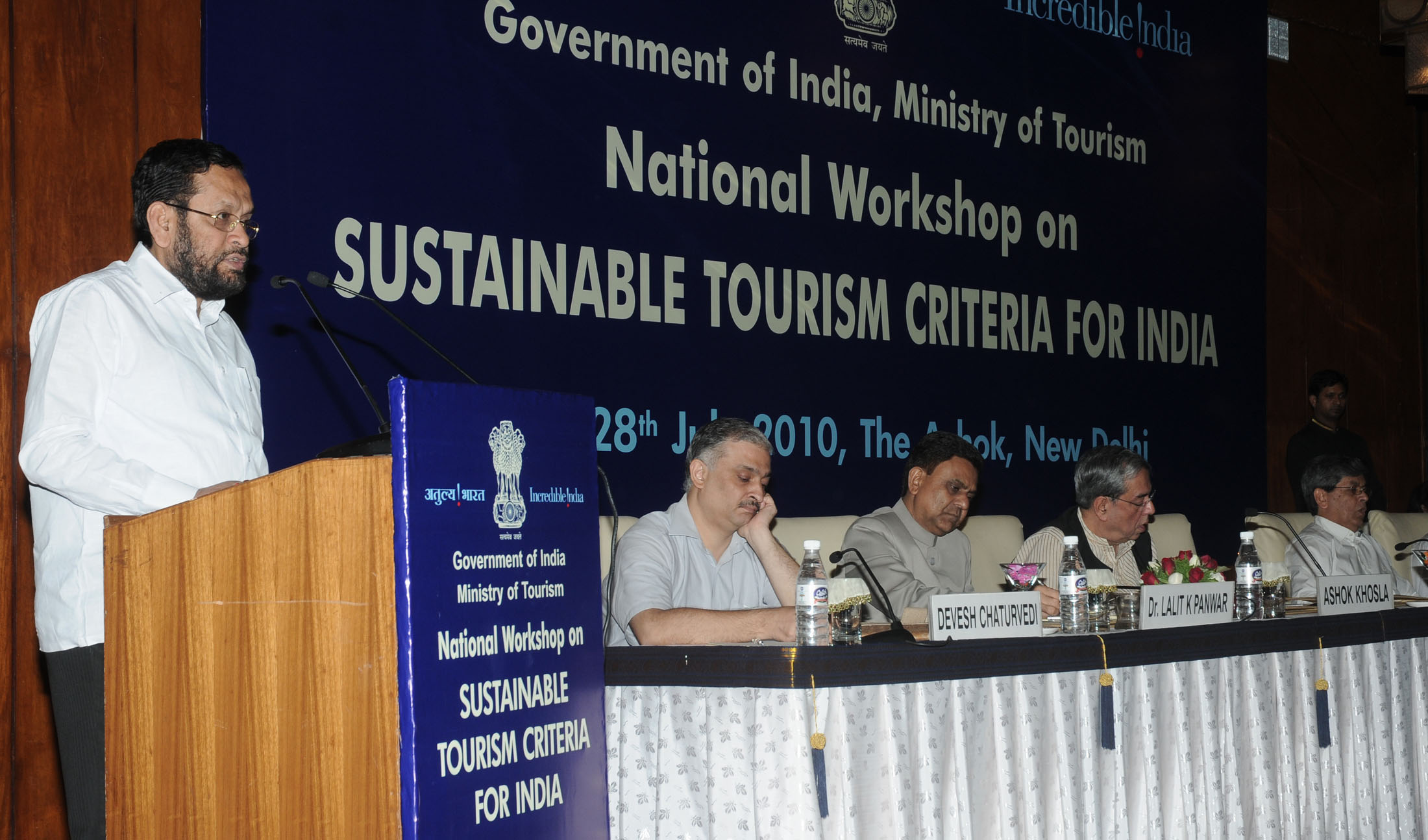
The Minister of State for Tourism, Shri Sultan Ahmed addressing at the inauguration of the 2-day National Workshop on "Sustainable Tourism Criteria for India", in New Delhi on July 27, 2010.

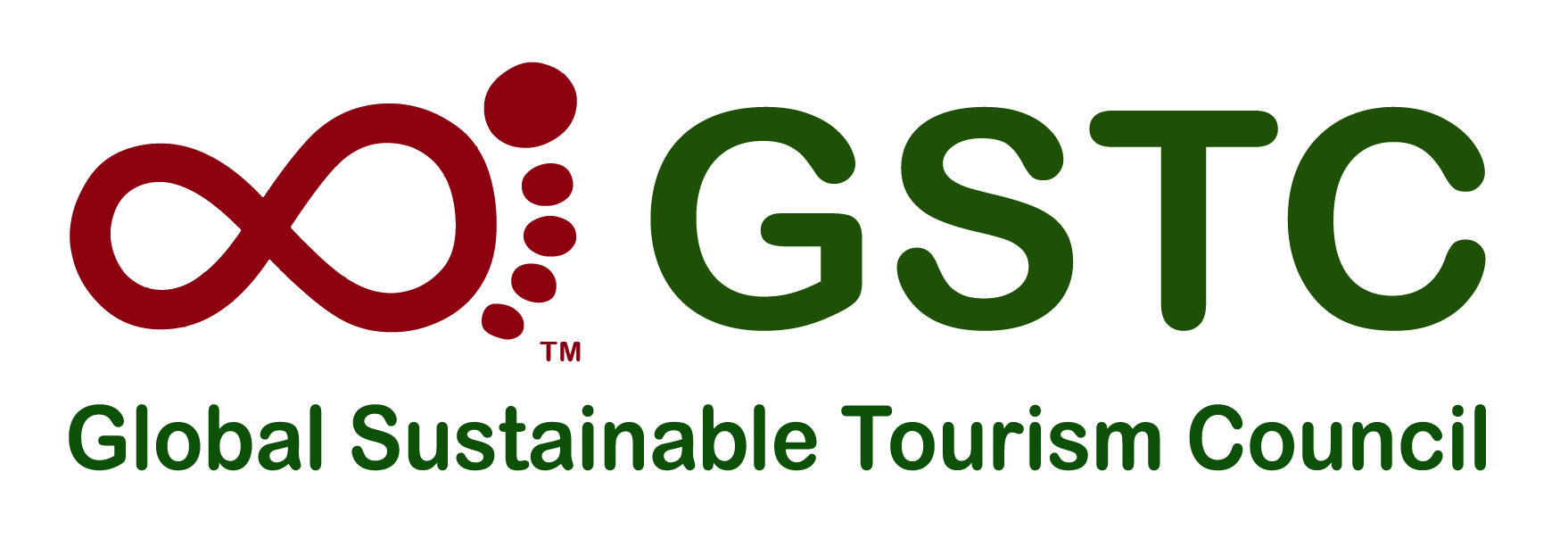
Logo of Global Sustainable Tourism Council.

=== Management aspects ===
Promotion of sustainable tourism practices are often connected to the management of tourist locations by locals or the community. This form of tourism is based on the premise that the people living next to a resource are the ones best suited to protecting it. This means that the tourism activities and businesses are developed and operated by local community members, and certainly with their consent and support. Sustainable tourism typically involves the conservation of resources that are capitalized upon for tourism purposes. Locals run the businesses and are responsible for promoting the conservation messages to protect their environment.

Community-based sustainable tourism (CBST) associates the success of the sustainability of the ecotourism location to the management practices of the communities who are directly or indirectly dependent on the location for their livelihoods. A salient feature of CBST is that local knowledge is usually utilized alongside wide general frameworks of ecotourism business models. This allows the participation of locals at the management level and typically allows a more intimate understanding of the environment.

The use of local knowledge also means an easier entry level into a tourism industry for locals whose jobs or livelihoods are affected by the use of their environment as tourism locations. Environmentally sustainable development crucially depends on the presence of local support for a project. It has also been noted that in order for success projects must provide direct benefits for the local community.

Furthermore, framework models for heritage tourism demonstrate that integrating community-directed governance and direct micro-economic engagement effectively mitigates cultural commodification and balances power asymmetries in indigenous travel corridors.

However, recent research has found that economic linkages generated by CBST may only be sporadic, and that the linkages with agriculture are negatively affected by seasonality and by the small scale of the cultivated areas. This means that CBST may only have small-scale positive effects for these communities.

Partnerships between governments and tourism agencies with smaller communities are not particularly effective because of the disparity in aims between the two groups, i.e. true sustainability versus mass tourism for maximum profit. In Honduras, such a divergence can be demonstrated where consultants from the World Bank and officials from the Institute of tourism wanted to set up a selection of 5-star hotels near various ecotourism destinations. But another operating approach in the region by USAID and APROECOH (an ecotourism association) promotes community-based efforts which have trained many local Hondurans. Grassroot organizations were more successful in Honduras.

=== As part of a development strategy ===
Developing countries are especially interested in international tourism, and many believe it brings countries a large selection of economic benefits including employment opportunities, small business development, and increased in payments of foreign exchange. However, many assume that more money is gained through developing luxury goods and services in spite of the fact that this increases a countries dependency on imported products, foreign investments and expatriate skills. This classic 'trickle down' financial strategy rarely makes its way down to brings its benefits down to small businesses.

It has been said that the economic benefits of large-scale tourism are not doubted but that the backpacker or budget traveler sector is often neglected as a potential growth sector by developing countries governments. This sector brings significant non-economic benefits which could help to empower and educate the communities involved in this sector. "Aiming 'low' builds upon the skills of the local population, promotes self-reliance, and develops the confidence of community members in dealing with outsiders, all signs of empowerment" and all of which aid in the overall development of a nation.

In the 1990s, international tourism was seen as an import potential growth sector for many countries, particularly in developing countries as many of the world's most beautiful and 'untouched' places are located in developing countries. Prior to the 1960s, studies tended to assume that the extension of the tourism industry to LEDCs was a good thing. In the 1970s, this changed as academics started to take a much more negative view on tourism's consequences, particularly criticizing the industry as an effective contributor towards development. International tourism is a volatile industry with visitors quick to abandon destinations that were formerly popular because of threats to health or security.

Tourism is seen as a resilient industry and bounces back quickly after severe setbacks, like natural disasters, September 11th attacks and COVID-19. Many call for more attention to "lessons learned" from these setbacks to improve mitigation measures that could be taken in advance.

=== Cultural improvements ===
Tourists can heavily impact a country's cultural heritage. For example, tourists exploring a country's heritage can encourage those practices and traditions to be perpetuated. The same can be said for local artistry: artisans continue crafting goods that reflect their culture somewhat due to rising tourist popularity. Marketplaces with high foot traffic from tourists can be extremely important for a country's community given that cultural and economic impacts are often intertwined. For over 44 countries, the tourism industry contributes to more than 15% of total employment. When traveling as a sustainable tourist, it is important to only appreciate the culture and not appropriate or dampen it. By better understanding different cultures through sustainable tourism, travelers can possess better cross-cultural understanding, mutual empathy, and tolerance.

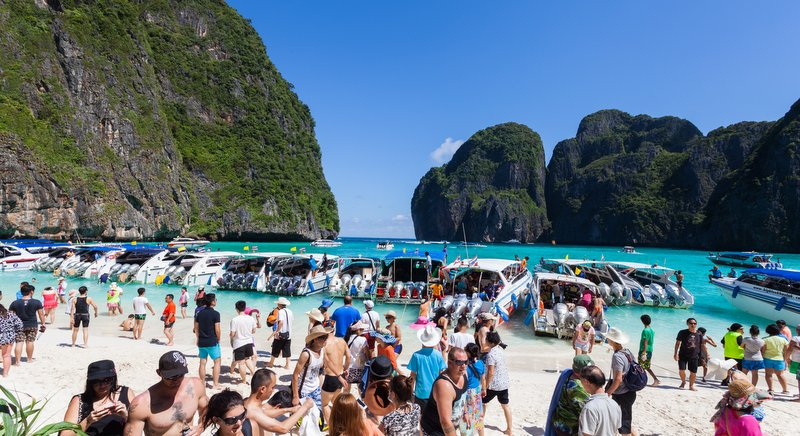
An overpopulated beach may lead to issues such as pollution, and taking land away from where indigenous people reside. It's not just indigenous, but coasts everywhere as Climate change poses an existential threat to the environmental and socioeconomic sustainability of coastal zones, with impacts that are complex and widespread. Evidence from California and across the United States shows that accelerating sea-level rise, marine heatwaves, and compounding extreme events are already challenging coastal communities and ecosystems. Expanding coordinated management and policy efforts could help sustain California's coastal regions under a changing climate.

== Trends ==
=== Impacts of COVID-19 pandemic ===
Due to COVID-19, an unprecedented decrease of 65% took place in international tourist numbers in first half of 2020 as compared to 2019. Countries around the world closed their borders and introduced travel restrictions in response to the pandemic. The situation is expected to gradually improve in 2021 depending upon lifting of travel restrictions, availability of COVID-19 vaccine and return of traveler confidence.

Furthermore, the COVID-19 pandemic made many sustainability challenges of tourism clearer. Therefore sustainable tourism scholars called for a transformation of tourism. They stated that the COVID-19 pandemic created a window of opportunity in which stakeholders could shift towards more sustainable practices and rethink systems. The system cannot be sustained in its current form. The constant aim for economic growth goes at the expense of Earth's ecosystems, wildlife, and well-being. The gap between rich and poor is growing every year, and the pandemic spurred this even further. Our current systems are often in place for the few, leaving the many behind. This is no different for the global and local tourism systems. Therefore, tourism scholars argue we should learn from the pandemic. "COVID-19 provides striking lessons to the tourism industry, policy makers and tourism researchers about the effects of global change. The challenge is now to collectively learn from this global tragedy to accelerate the transformation of sustainable tourism".

Technology is seen as a partial solution to the disruptive impacts of pandemics like COVID-19. Although it can be counterproductive for sustainable tourism if it is utilized for data collection that may be misused for mass tourism, technology and digital advancements have provided the tools necessary for e-tourism to evolve and become more valuable amidst the pandemic. Scholars argue that "surrogate tourism" will allow tourists to remain home while employing local guides at the destination to facilitate personalized, interactive, real-time tours (PIRTs). While these options will not take the place of conventional travel experience, there is a market for PIRTs especially for persons with disabilities and the elderly, and for the "sustainable citizen who wishes to minimize their impact on the planet".

== History ==
Historically, the movement toward sustainable tourism through responsible tourism emerged following the environmental awareness that rose out of the 1960s and 1970s amid a growing phenomenon of "mass tourism". In 1973, the European Travel Commission initiated a multilateral effort to advance environmentally sound tourism and development. Jost Krippendorf, a former professor at the University of Bern, is considered to be one of the first individuals to express ideas about sustainable tourism. In his book The landscape eaters, Krippendorf argues for "sanfter turismus", or "soft tourism". The South African national tourism policy (1996) used the term "responsible tourism" and mentioned the well-being of the local community as a main factor. In 2014, the Cape Town Declaration on Responsible Tourism focused on the role of business in promoting responsible tourism. While further research is needed to understand the impacts of responsible tourism, a study conducted in 2017 found that well-managed responsible tourism practices were beneficial to local communities.

== Examples ==
=== Forest tourism ===
The Haliburton Sustainable Forest in central Ontario, Canada is a sustainably managed and privately owned 100,000 forest that supports both tourism and the logging industry. Based on a 100-year plan for sustaining the forest, the Haliburton Sustainable Forest has sources of income with tourism and logging that contribute to the long-term stability of the local economy and to the health of the forest. In just over four decades the forest has been transformed from a run-down forestry holding to a flourishing, multi-use operation with benefits to owners, employees and the public at large as well as the environment.

=== Sustainable touristic cities ===
- In 2019, Machu Picchu in Peru was "recognized as Latin America's first 100% sustainable city through the management of its waste".
- The country of Bhutan is notably sustainable as well, it is one of the only carbon neutral countries. Bhutan offsets carbon footprints produced by both locals and tourists alike through hydro-powered renewable energy and its vast forest land, which functions as a natural carbon sink.

=== Organizations ===
Biosphere Tourism is an organization that certifies industry players who are able to balance sociocultural, economic and ecological factors within a tourism destination. The Tread Right Foundation (The Travel Corporation's not-for-profit foundation) has been recognized in 2019 by the UNWTO's annual awards for its pioneering work in sustainability.

=== Geosport ===
Geosport is one of the latest concepts in the field of tourism, mainly focusing on promoting spaces, sports heritage sites, and routes as means of attracting tourists through sustainability and sustainable management measures. Geosport combines local cultural heritage, natural resources, and destination branding with sport. It allows visitors to explore the local cultural and natural heritage more deeply. By enhancing the communication between people and the environment, the concepts of sustainable development and environmental protection are subtly promoted.

== See also ==
- BEST Education Network
- Heritage tourism
- International Year of Sustainable Tourism for Development
- Journal of Sustainable Tourism
- Mohonk Agreement
- Low impact diving
- World Tourism Day
- Overtourism
- IT.A.CÀ - Festival of Responsible Tourism
- Nature-positive
