= Nature Futures Framework =

Framework for envisioning positive futures for nature and people

The Nature Futures Framework (NFF) is a values-based approach developed under the auspices of the Intergovernmental Science-Policy Platform on Biodiversity and Ecosystem Services (IPBES). It supports the development of multiscale, cross-sectoral scenarios and models of desirable futures for people, nature and "Mother Earth". The framework addresses challenges documented in the IPBES Methodological Assessment of Scenarios and Models of Biodiversity and Ecosystem Services (2016) as well as calls for more inclusive, nature-centred, and positive visions for biodiversity, ecosystem services, and human well-being.

== Background ==
Early work within IPBES highlighted that most global environmental scenarios—such as those used by the Intergovernmental Panel on Climate Change—focused primarily on socioeconomic and climate trajectories, with biodiversity and ecosystem services appearing as outcomes rather than central elements. The 2016 IPBES methodological assessment recommended a new, dedicated framework for exploring "positive" futures for nature that would integrate ecological, social, and cultural dimensions.

Following this recommendation, the IPBES Expert group on Models and Scenarios developed the Multiscale, Cross-Sectoral Scenarios for Nature Futures framework. This approach introduced the idea that scenarios for biodiversity and ecosystem services must explicitly reflect diverse human–nature relationships and values across multiple scales and sectors. This document then set up a series of consultations by which the IPBES Task Force on Models and Scenarios developed the Nature Futures Framework.

== Concept ==
The Nature Futures Framework provides a conceptual "values space" that recognises three broad perspectives, which represent a minimal complexity, to capture the potential positive relationships between people and nature:

- Nature for Nature – emphasising the intrinsic value of biodiversity and ecosystems, prioritising conservation and ecological integrity;
- Nature for Society – focusing on the instrumental benefits of nature for human well-being, such as ecosystem services and natural capital; and
- Nature as Culture – highlighting relational values, including identity, stewardship, reciprocity, and a sense of place.

These three perspectives form a triangle that captures the range of ways people value and interact with nature. Scenarios, narratives, and models can be placed within this space to explore synergies and trade-offs among different worldviews. The NFF serves as a heuristic device rather than a prescriptive framework—it allows users to articulate desirable futures without imposing a single normative endpoint.

== Development ==
The framework was co-designed by the IPBES Expert Group and then Task Force on Scenarios and Models between 2016 and 2019 through global participatory workshops involving researchers, policy experts, and Indigenous and local knowledge holders.

The Nature Futures Framework was formally recognised by the IPBES Plenary in 2022 as part of its work programme on scenarios and models. In 2023, IPBES published an official methodological guidance document, titled The Nature Futures Framework, a flexible tool to support the development of scenarios and models of desirable futures for people, nature and Mother Earth, and its methodological guidance. This report describes the conceptual foundations, methodological steps, and example applications of the framework, providing practical advice for integrating diverse value systems into scenarios of positive futures.

== Applications ==
Since 2020, the NFF has been applied in global and regional contexts to link plural value perspectives with quantitative modelling of biodiversity and ecosystem services

In 2025, a literature review identified over seventy peer-reviewed papers engaging with the NFF, spanning disciplines such as conservation planning, foresight, and social–ecological systems research. The study concluded that most applications integrated multiple value perspectives but noted ongoing challenges in operationalising relational values and connecting participatory visions with policy and modelling frameworks.

== Purpose and significance ==
The Nature Futures Framework represents a shift from problem-oriented to solution-oriented scenario development. It focuses on identifying visions and possible pathways towards "positive futures" that integrate biodiversity conservation with human well-being and justice considerations. By embedding intrinsic, instrumental, and relational values in scenario design, the framework provides a foundation for policy and research aimed at achieving a "nature-positive" world.

== See also ==
- IPBES
- Ecosystem services
- Nature-based solutions
- Resilience (ecology)
- Futures studies
