= Ana María Hernández Salgar =

UN biodiversity chair

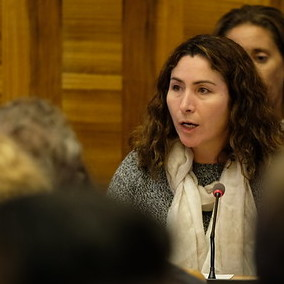
Ana Maria Hernandez chairs meeting in 2019

Ana María Hernández Salgar (born December 23 1972) is a Colombian professional in international relations. She worked as the Head of Office International Affairs, Policy and Cooperation at the Alexander von Humboldt Biological Resources Research Institute.

From may 6, 2019 to August 2023, she was appointed as the chair of the Intergovernmental Platform on Biodiversity and Ecosystem Services (IPBES)., the IPCC of biodiversity. She replaced the outgoing chair, Robert Watson. As the newly elected chair of IPBES, she did an interview with RCN Radio on the 2019 IPBES Report on threats to biodiversity.

Political offices
Preceded by Robert Watson	Chair of the IPBES; 2019– 2023	Succeeded by David Obura
