= Global Biodiversity Framework Fund =

Global biodiversity conservation fund

- Abbreviation: GBFF
- Formation: August 2023; 3 years ago
- Type: Multilateral environmental fund
- Purpose: Financing biodiversity conservation and restoration
- Headquarters: Washington, D.C., United States
- Parent organization: Global Environment Facility

The Global Biodiversity Framework Fund (GBFF) is a multilateral environmental financing mechanism established to support implementation of the Kunming-Montreal Global Biodiversity Framework (GBF) under the Convention on Biological Diversity (CBD).

The fund is hosted by the Global Environment Facility (GEF) and is intended to mobilise and channel financial resources to help countries implement biodiversity conservation and restoration measures aligned with global biodiversity targets.

== History ==
The fund was launched in August 2023 at the Seventh GEF Assembly in Vancouver, Canada, following international negotiations on financing for biodiversity protection. It forms part of global efforts to scale up biodiversity finance and support implementation of international commitments to halt and reverse biodiversity loss. The GBFF is one of several international financial mechanisms supporting implementation of biodiversity agreements and conservation goals.

The fund was created in response to calls for a dedicated financing mechanism following adoption of the Kunming-Montreal Global Biodiversity Framework at the 2022 United Nations Biodiversity Conference (COP15). The framework established global targets to halt and reverse biodiversity loss by 2030, including protecting at least 30% of the world's land and oceans and mobilising at least $200 billion per year for biodiversity-related spending.

In 2025, the GBFF approved $28 million of funding, supporting conservation initiatives and ecosystem protection programmes in several regions. In 2026, the GBFF has approved $87 million of funding, out of the $372 million approved by the GEF.
