= Mohonk Agreement =

Mohonk Agreement is a framework and principles for the certification of ecotourism and sustainable tourism.

== History ==
The Mohonk Agreement was an informal consensus for the harmonization and development of a common baseline for sustainable tourism and ecotourism certification. It was developed among most of the world's important certification programs at that time, who met at Mohonk Mountain House, New Paltz, New York on November 17–19, 2000. It was the first consensus agreement that clearly differentiates between sustainable tourism, whose principles can be applied to any kind of tourism at any scale, and ecotourism, which is a subset of sustainable tourism with a clearly defined relationship of the business and its clients with nature, conservation, local culture, and interpretation.

== Importance ==
It has since served as a principle reference for the development of most sustainable tourism and ecotourism certification programs around the world, as well as a fundamental reference for: the World Tourism Organization's (UN-WTO) indicators for certification in "A Guidebook for Indicators of Sustainable Development for Tourism Destinations", the "VISIT Standard" for European certification standards, the "Baseline Criteria for Sustainable Tourism Certification in the Americas" of the Sustainable Tourism Certification Network of the Americas. It is expected, along with more recent developments, such as those just cited, to form part of the baseline criteria for a future accreditation program, currently under development, tentatively entitled the "Sustainable Tourism Stewardship Council" or STSC.

== Structure of the agreement ==
The Mohonk Agreement lists the general principles and elements that should be the components of any certification program for sustainable tourism or the smaller niche of ecotourism. The principal aspects that should be part of any program are:

1. Overall
  1. Adaptation to local geographic (including sociocultural) conditions and sectors of the tourist industry, while complying with a series of universal principles.
  2. Clear objectives, benefits, and procedures.
  3. A defined standard with criteria that meet the objective, exceed what is required by law, and balance performance and process-based elements.
  4. The program should be transparent, free of conflicts of interest, and require audits, as well as considering the interests of consumers and local communities.
2. For sustainable tourism certification, criteria that reduce negative environmental and sociocultural impacts while benefiting the place where tourism takes place:
  1. General aspects: six basic criteria are listed
  2. Sociocultural aspects: four basic criteria are listed
  3. Environmental aspects: twelve basic criteria are listed
  4. Economic aspects: four basic criteria are listed
3. For ecotourism certification, there is a clear differentiation as a niche within sustainable tourism that not only reduces negative impacts, but also produces net positive impacts for the environment and the communities that are visited.
  1. All of the criteria for sustainable tourism listed above should be met, preferable to best industry practice.
  2. There are seven additional general criteria that clearly differentiate ecotourism from sustainable tourism in general.
