= IT.A.CÀ - Festival of Responsible Tourism =

Italian widespread annual festival

IT.A.CÀ Migrants & Travellers - Festival of Responsible Tourism (in Italian Language IT.A.CÀ Migranti e viaggiatori - Festival del Turismo Responsabile) is an Italian widespread annual festival, dedicated to sustainable and responsible tourism.

== History ==
IT.A.CÀ Festival was founded in 2009 when three no-profit associations from Bologna, Italy (ASD Yoda, with Cospe Onlus and Nexus Emilia Romagna) started supporting and promoting Sustainable tourism.

The first few-day-long editions took place in the Bologna area but the success and the growing network of interested associations made the Festival grew quickly with new places added to the schedule year by year. More than 300 events were set for the 2018 edition, while in 2019 Liguria joined the IT.A.Cà network, followed by Sardinia in 2021 with its Ogliastra sub-region. In 2021 the 13th edition took place with stages in over 14 Italian regions between May and November, reaching the more than 500 Italian and international players from the fields of tourism, culture and environment. The following year, the Festival started adopting a central theme strategy, with the 14th edition of 2022 around "Habitat - Living the future". Moreover, in the same year, with the support of the Comune of Lanusei in Sardinia and of Sardaigne en liberté, IT.A.Cà festival stated a European project for an International Festival of Responsible Tourism, thanks to the network of international players already involve in the Italian edition. The First meeting took place in Algarve, Portugal on 22 April 2022.

== Values and Mission ==
IT.A.CÀ Festival (whose name recalls Ulysses native island with an assonance of the bolognese dialect for "You are at home?") "aims to creating a network of different organizations involved in responsible travel, and to engage participants in a multisensory experience.", with an agenda that "guided tours aimed at enhancing the cultural and historical heritage of the area, debates and meetings with experts in the field, seminars, lunches at "kilometer zero", experiential dinners, writing contests, illustration and photography, exhibitions, concerts, film screenings and theater.

Through a series fo free events, workshops, conferences, activities, sports in plain nature (including bike tours and trekking with donkeys) and cultural events, the festival aims to raise awareness in travellers, institutions, industries and tourist players on the weight of traditional tourism and the alternative positive edges of Sustainable tourism.

== Festival Editions ==
=== XIII Edition - 2021: "Right of Breathing" (Diritto di Respirare) ===
The 13th edition moved through Italy with the theme of "Right of Breathing", involving 16 regions with more than 25 different stages, spread from May to November.

The high significance of this edition is pinpointed in the debut of Sardinia in the network, and the consequent stage, amog others in the region, of Lanusei, where - from 24 September to 3 October - a meeting of international player took place (elected as "European meeting"), forging the base for next year's international festival debut. During this meeting in Lanusei different players attended, including representant of the Forum Anders Reisen, to discuss about underpaied work, social justice and minimum wage.

=== XIV Edition - 2022: "Habitat - Living the Future" (Habitat - Abitare il futuro) ===
The 2022 edition took place aroun sustainability of living and of territories. In addition to the University of Bologna, who supported the festival since the beginning, other Italian Universities took part, including University of Cagliari and University of Pavia.

=== XV Edition - 2023: "A whole other story - Communities tell the territories" (Tutta un’Altra Storia – Le comunità raccontano i territori) ===
The 15th edition of 2023 includes 20 stages in 11 regions, from may to October. Events took place from North Italy to the South, giving voice to the territories, that becomes real narrators of their story, their need and their future.

== Awards ==
In 2018 the IT.A.Cà received the UNWTO Award in the "Non-Governmental Organizations" by the World Tourism Organization of the United Nations
