= Alexander von Humboldt Biological Resources Research Institute =

Colombian publicly funded biological research institute

- Instituto de Investigación de Recursos Biológicos Alexander von Humboldt

Agency overview
- Formed: 22 December 1993
- Headquarters: Diagonal 27 # 15 - 09, Bogotá, D. C., Colombia
- Agency executive: Hernando García Martínez Ph.D., Director General
- Parent agency: Ministry of Environment and Sustainable Development
- Website: www.humboldt.org.co

The Alexander von Humboldt Biological Resources Research Institute (Spanish: Instituto de Investigación de Recursos Biológicos Alexander von Humboldt), sometimes referred to as IAVH, is an independent non-regulatory research institute of the Executive Branch of the Government of Colombia charged with conducting scientific research on the biodiversity of the country including hydrobiology and genetic research. The institute is named after Alexander von Humboldt, a German naturalist who researched the biodiversity of Colombia and Latin America.

== See also ==
- Ana María Hernández Salgar
