= Nature-positive =

Global goal for nature

Nature-positive is a concept and goal to halt and reverse nature loss by 2030, and to achieve full nature recovery by 2050. According to the World Wide Fund for Nature, the aim is to achieve this through "measurable gains in the health, abundance, diversity, and resilience of species, ecosystems, and natural processes." Progress towards this goal is generally measured from a biodiversity baseline of 2020 levels.

The nature-positive goal aligns with the 2030 mission and 2050 vision of the Kunming-Montreal Global Biodiversity Framework (GBF). However, the GBF does not explicitly mention nature positive. The goal is designed to integrate with the United Nations' Sustainable Development Goals and the Paris Agreement's climate goals. It is distinct from other policy approaches stopping biodiversity loss, such as "no net loss" or "net positive impact".

Governments have committed to the nature positive goal, including the United Kingdom, Australia, and Japan. Over 90 world leaders have signed the Leaders' Pledge for Nature, which calls for a nature-positive future by 2030. A commitment to nature positive was also signed by the members of the G7 at the 47th summit in 2021 and a G7 Alliance on Nature Positive Economies has since been launched.

== Definition ==
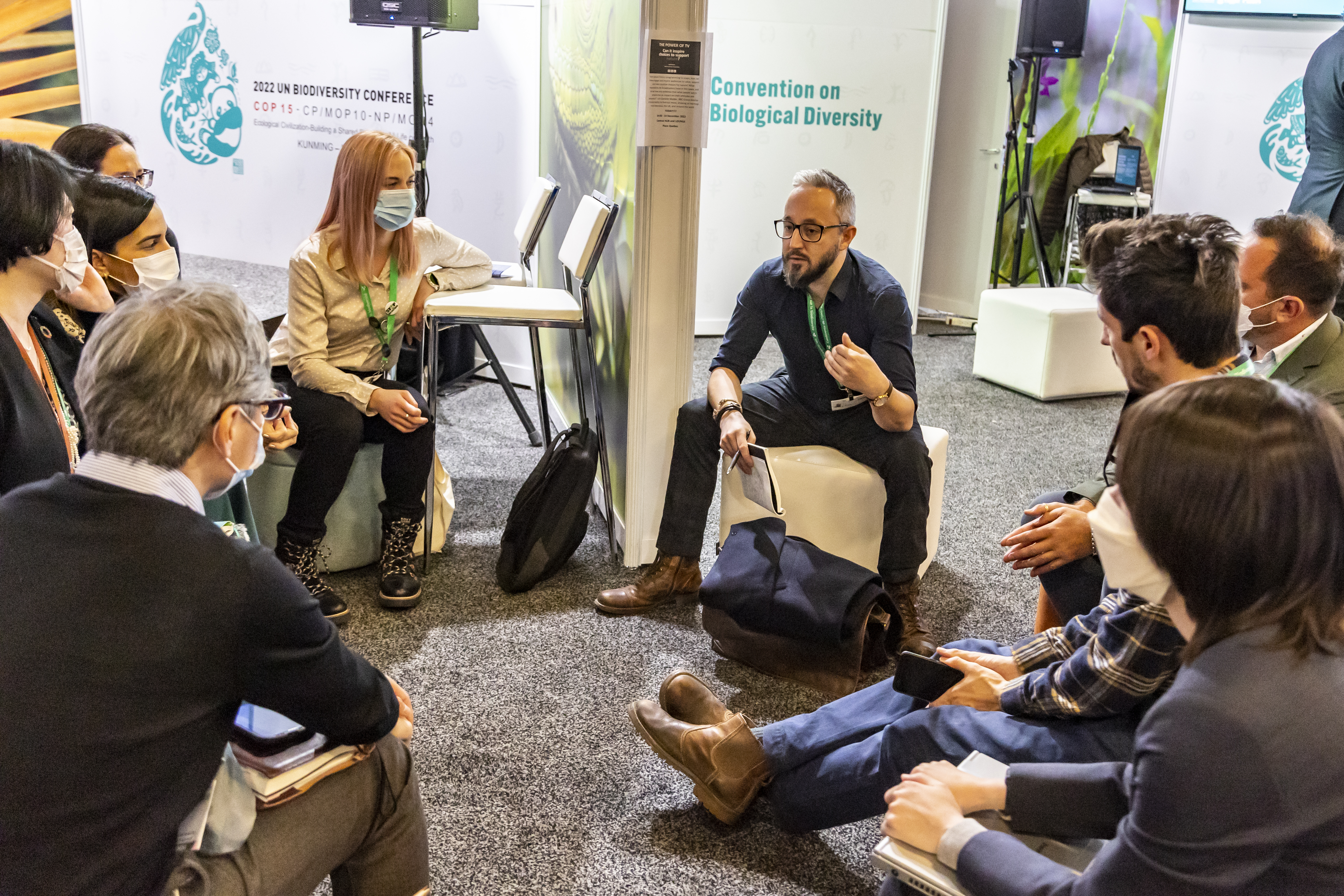
Discussion of the definition for nature positive at COP15

Nature positive was defined by the Nature Positive Initiative as a global societal goal to "halt and reverse nature loss by 2030 on a 2020 baseline, and achieve full recovery by 2050." This means that progress towards stopping the loss of nature would be measured relative to levels of biodiversity in 2020.

Similarly, in a 2021 paper, Locke et al. defined nature positive as "halting and reversing nature loss by 2030, measured from a baseline of 2020." This definition uses the IPBES definition of nature, referring to "the natural world, with an emphasis on its living components", according to the IPBES definition.

A broad range of definitions have been used by institutions and governments since the term was introduced. This led to criticism of nature positive as vague and open to variable interpretation. Concerns have also been raised over the vulnerability of nature positive to greenwashing, the "net" approach to biodiversity, and over the "financialization of nature".

=== Distinction from existing policy approaches ===
Nature positive differs from previous biodiversity strategies, including "no net loss" (NNL) policy and "net positive impact (NPI)" approaches. No net loss refers to biodiversity policy that aims to neutralise the loss of biodiversity, relative to an appropriately determined reference scenario. Net positive impact refers to a goal for project outcomes, where the project's impact on biodiversity is outweighed by actions to reduce, rehabilitate, and offset these impacts. NNL and NPI differ because NNL focuses on preventing losses, while NPI focuses on aiming for a net gain in biodiversity. Metrics are required to quantify these losses and gains.

NNL and NPI generally focus on applying the mitigation hierarchy, a tool commonly used in environmental impact assessment to manage risk to biodiversity that uses a hierarchy of steps (avoidance, minimisation, rehabilitation, restoration, and offsetting), to the direct impacts of an organisation. However, direct impacts are only a small fraction of the biodiversity impacts of an organisation. The scope of nature positive extends beyond direct impacts, to the whole value chain of a company (all activities needed to deliver goods or services to customers) of a company and to sector-wide for transformative improvements in sustainability practices. Frameworks for nature positive that extend beyond the classical mitigation hierarchy have been proposed, such as the Mitigation and Conservation Hierarchy and the SBTN's AR3T framework.

Nature positive also emphasises review and transformation to align all the decisions within a business with the goal of achieving nature positive. This involves embedding nature in decision-making, governance, strategy, and management of risks – a process described as mainstreaming. Mainstreaming distinguishes nature positive from NNL and NPI approaches, where biodiversity considerations are generally dealt with by ecological managers at project sites. In addition to mainstreaming, nature positive aims to integrate natural and social issues, rather than addressing these issues separately. It also aims to scale against global or regional societal goals to achieve absolute gains for biodiversity, instead of relative gains. By contrast, the ambition of NNL and NPI has historically been at the project level, comparing to a baseline of declining baseline and not to overall targets.

Overall, nature positive, NNL, and NPI policies differ through their scope, mainstreaming (embedding biodiversity considerations across a business or organisation), integration, and ambition.

== Background ==
Chart showing the Living Planet Index since 1970, showing decline in species population

Nature is essential for economic and societal function. However, biodiversity loss is occurring rapidly on a global scale – since 1970, wildlife populations declined by 69%, on average, between 1970 and 2018 according to the Living Planet Index. Biodiversity loss and its potential effects on ecosystem functioning, ecosystem services, the global economy, and wider society have gained increasing attention.

This has led to international environmental agreements (such as the Aichi Biodiversity Targets), national plans (such as National Biodiversity Strategy and Action Plans), corporate commitments, and local action. However, these have largely failed to fulfil their targets - for example, only 6 of 67 sub-targets of the Aichi Biodiversity Targets were achieved by its target year, 2020.

By 2020, proponents of nature positive argued that there was no concise headline goal to address biodiversity loss – while the 2030 Agenda for Sustainable Development proposes equitable human development, the UN Framework Convention on Climate Change puts forward a carbon-neutral goal of net zero emissions for 2050, and the Paris Climate Change Agreement aims to limit global warming to 1.5 °C above pre-industrial levels, there was no equivalent for biodiversity loss. Nature positive was therefore proposed as a "global goal for nature" to integrate with climate and development goals and direct future global agreements to an "Equitable, Nature-Positive, Carbon Neutral world."

== Support for the term and concept ==
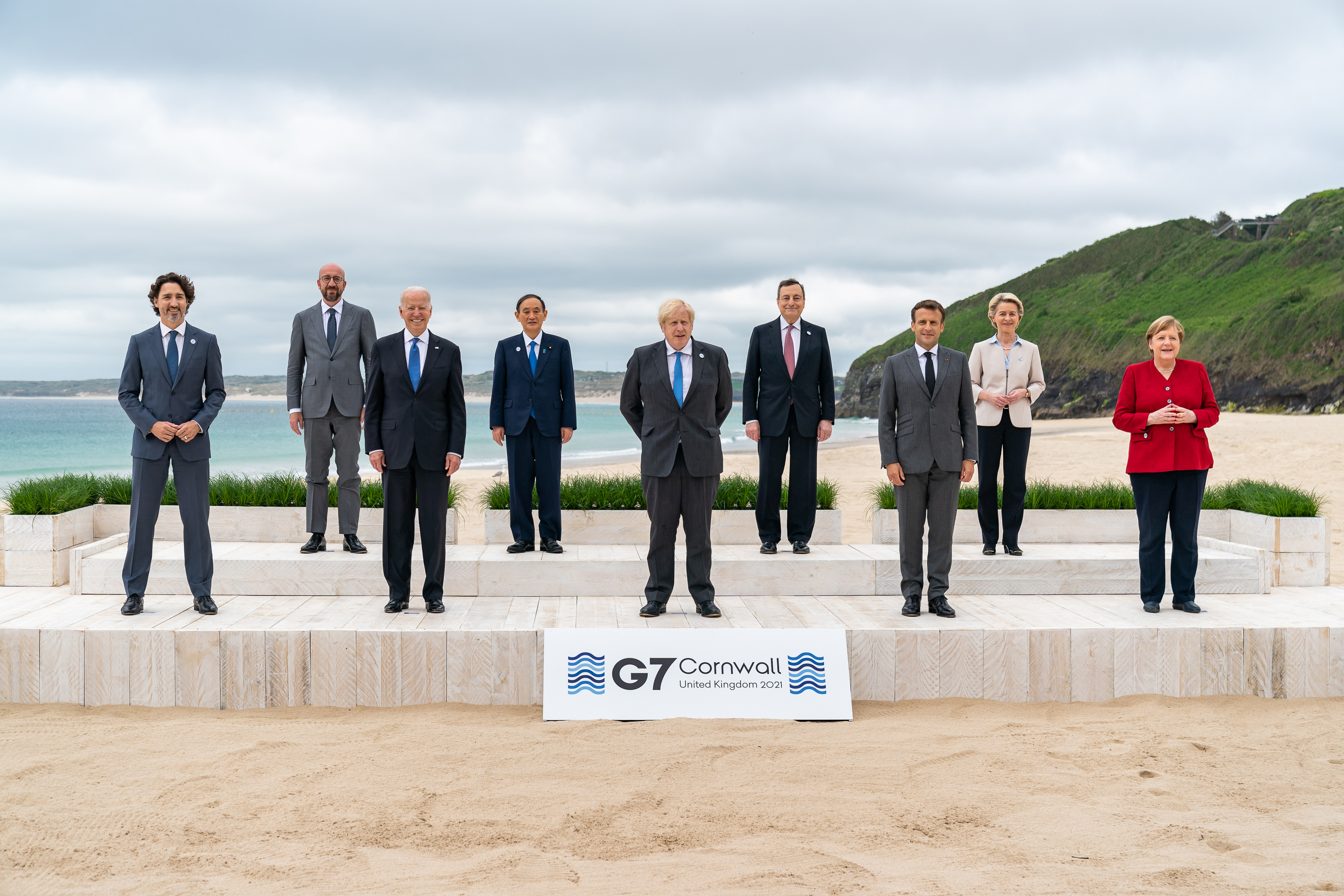
G7 leaders at the 47th summit in Cornwall, United Kingdom in 2021

Nature-positive is increasingly being discussed by businesses, governments, and NGOs. For example, the United Nations, World Economic Forum, the G7, and the European Union have all discussed the nature positive goal, both within and beyond published reports. In addition, the Nature Positive Initiative (NPI) was launched in September 2023 to promote awareness of the nature-positive goal and align the definition used for the term.

Governments have committed to the nature positive goal, including the United Kingdom, Australia, and Japan. Within the United Kingdom, the devolved government in Scotland has committed to nature positive by 2030. Over 90 world leaders have signed the Leaders' Pledge for Nature, which calls for a nature-positive future by 2030. A commitment to nature positive was also signed by the members of the G7 at the 47th summit in 2021 and a G7 Alliance on Nature Positive Economies has since been launched.

=== The United Nations ===
The term nature-positive has been used by the United Nations (UN) in several reports published by its programmes and agencies. For example, the UN Environment Programme Finance Initiative (UNEP FI) published a 'Financial Sector Guide for the Convention on Biological Diversity' in June 2021. It described this report as "nature-positive finance guidance" with the aim of mobilising "financial institutions to engage positively with nature." The UNEP FI also published a report entitled 'Adapt to Survive: Business transformation in a time of uncertainty' in 2021, which states that "shifting towards a Nature Positive approach is the best way for business to transform" and defines a Nature Positive economy as "an economy that is regenerative, collaborative and where growth is only valued where it contributes to social progress and environmental protection." Nature is a key theme for the United Nations Environment Programme Finance Initiative (UNEP FI), described as "accelerating nature-positive action in the finance industry."

In November 2021, the United Nations Development Programme (UNDP), the UNEP World Conservation Monitoring Centre (UNEP-WCMC), and the Secretariat for the Convention on Biological Diversity (SCBD) published a report entitled 'Creating a Nature Positive Future: The Contribution of Protected Areas and Other Effective Area-Based Conservation Measures'. This report defined nature positive as "actions that increase resilience of the planet and biodiversity, as well as societies, with the aim of creating a paradigm shift to reduce the loss of nature, secure nature's contributions critical for humanity, and enhance sustainable socio-economic development."

Following COP15 in December 2022, the Nature Positive Tourism Partnership was launched by the UN World Tourism Organisation with the World Travel & Tourism Council and the Sustainable Hospitality Alliance. On April 22, 2024, the 'Nature Positive Travel & Tourism' report was published.

Nature-positive has been used by the UN beyond its published reports. For example, nature positive food systems were the focus of a Global Summit Dialogue in 2021, as part of the UN Food Systems Summit. The nature-positive goal has been discussed by the UN Framework Convention on Climate Change, which uses the NPI definition of the term. Also, as part of its Decade on Restoration, UNEP partnered with the University of Oxford to launch Nature Positive Universities (NPU). The aim of NPU is to help universities achieve the nature positive goal and encourages them to make a 'Nature Positive Pledge'.

== Critique ==
Nature-positive has been criticised as vague and vulnerable to greenwashing. This is partly because different definitions have been used to describe the term across institutions since its emergence. To align the definition of nature-positive and ensure the integrity of its use, the Nature Positive Initiative was launched in September 2023 and published a definition that has subsequently been used widely.

Fears were expressed that increased use of the term had introduced a danger of diluting its meaning, where used too freely to refer to any action that benefits nature. In a 2022 paper, E.J. Milner-Gulland proposed that, to avoid greenwashing, the nature-positive goal requires a measured biodiversity baseline, a timeframe, a target, a clear set of actions, an analysis of how these actions will add up to reach net gain, regular monitoring, and disclosure of progress. Furthermore, in a 2024 paper, Maron and colleagues argued the need to implement the mitigation hierarchy as essential to prevent greenwashing and enable achievement of the nature-positive goal.

The concept of a nature-positive economy was criticised in an open letter by the think-tank Green Finance Observatory in November 2022. The letter raised concerns about the concept of a nature positive economy as promoting the "financialization of nature's destruction" and diverting focus from ongoing biodiversity loss. Similarly, nature-positive was criticised by Greenpeace in 2022 as focusing on "saving a failed economic model" over the protection of biodiversity, promoting the "financialization of nature", and described the measures it uses (a 2020 nature baseline, net positive nature improvements by 2030, and full nature recovery by 2050) as vague. Response to these criticisms came from E.J. Milner-Gulland, who said that "there is no solution without business – painting business as the enemy is an own goal."

Further criticisms have resulted from the application of a net approach as part of the nature-positive concept. This implies that loss and degradation of biodiversity will continue. However, Friends of the Earth have argued that the net approach fails to account for loss of ecosystem function, assumes like-for-like compensation is possible, and sets unrealistic expectations for offsetting. The conservationists that proposed nature-positive argue that this is an "inevitable result of humanity's ongoing demand [...] and differing stages of development."

Nature positive commitments made by governments have received criticism. For example, in the UK, the British Government has been called on by the Wildlife Trusts to raise its ambition for nature positive development through the Biodiversity Net Gain policy and the devolved government in Wales was called on by Climate Cymru, RSPB Cymru, and Wales Environment Link to draft a Nature Positive Bill. In Australia, the definition of nature positive used by the government was criticised, including by Megan Evans at the University of New South Wales, who described it as "a pathetic definition." A 2024 analysis argues that achieving nature-positive outcomes will require mandatory biodiversity “net-gain” legislation, because voluntary commitments and undefined metrics risk allowing ongoing biodiversity decline despite the rhetoric of nature-positive goals.

== By country ==
=== Australia ===
In recent years, Australia has included the nature-positive goal in its environmental policy. For example, the Australian government's Department of Climate Change, Energy, the Environment, and Water released a Nature Positive Plan (NPP) in 2022. In this plan, the government set out proposed legal reforms, including to establish Environment Protection Australia and Environment Information Australia. The plan also made commitments to protect 30% of the country's land and sea by 2030 and to work towards zero new extinctions. This commitment aligns with the 30 by 30 target set out by the Kunming-Montreal Global Biodiversity Framework. To fund the continued implementation of the NPP, the government announced $40.9 million between 2024 and 2026, as part of the 2024 Federal Budget. The budget has been criticised by environmental groups and academics, including because of the allocation of more funds to carbon capture and storage than to addressing biodiversity loss.

As part of the legal reforms proposed by the NPP, Minister for the Environment and Water, Tanya Plibersek, proposed The Nature Positive (Environment Information Australia) Bill 2024 to establish Environment Information Australia. The bill defines nature-positive as "an improvement in the diversity, abundance, resilience and integrity of ecosystems from a baseline." This definition of nature-positive has received criticism because it does not include a 2020 baseline for measurable improvement, and instead leaves this to be determined by the Head of Environment Information Australia. Senior Lecturer in environmental policy at the University of New South Wales, Megan Evans, described this as "absolutely greenwashing" and said that "it is a pathetic definition". An amendment to the definition set out in the bill was proposed by Crossbench MP, Zoe Daniel, that instead defines nature-positive as "halting and reversing the decline in diversity, abundance, resilience and integrity of ecosystems and native species populations by 2030 (measured against a 2021 baseline), and achieving recovery by 2050." However, this bill was later withdrawn.

Australia hosted the Global Nature Positive Summit at Sydney's International Convention Centre from 8–10 October 2024. The aim of the summit was to "inform the design of nature positive activities" and boost private sector investment by bringing together ministers, private sector leaders, First Nations peoples, scientists, academics, and community leaders.

=== European Union ===
The European Union (EU) has expressed support for the nature-positive goal. In September 2020, President of the European Commission at the time, Ursula von der Leyen endorsed the Leaders' Pledge for Nature. Later, at the 47th G7 Summit, the EU was among member states that made a commitment to halt and reverse biodiversity loss by 2030. The EU is also a member of the G7 Alliance on Nature Positive Economies (G7ANPE), established in April 2023. The French, Italian, and German governments are members of the G7ANPE too.

The European Commission has published a number of reports that discuss transition to nature positive economies. For example, the European Commission Directorate-General for Research & Innovation released a report from independent experts about the role of nature-based solutions for a nature-positive economy. In June 2024, a mid-term review of the EU's 8th Environmental Action Programme reiterated a call to member states to "mainstream an ecosystem approach" and to work towards nature-positive economies and societies.

=== Japan ===
The nature-positive goal has been discussed by the Japanese government since at least 2022. The Study Group on Nature Positive Economies was established by the Ministry of the Environment in March 2022, leading to the publication of 'Transition Strategies toward Nature Positive Economy' in March 2024 by the Ministry of the Environment, Ministry of Agriculture, Forestry and Fisheries, the Ministry of Economy, Trade and Industry, and the Ministry of Land, Infrastructure, Transport and Tourism. The aim of the strategy is to work towards implementing the 'National Biodiversity Strategy and Action Plan' (NBSAP), announced in March 2023. The NBSAP includes Basic Strategy 3, the aim to achieve a nature-positive economy. This is part of Japan's commitment to the Kunming-Montreal Global Biodiversity Framework.

The Japan Conference for the 2030 Global Biodiversity Framework (J-GBF) was established in 2021 to achieve the 30 by 30 target and the post-2020 biodiversity framework. The first J-GBF assembly, held in February 2023, announced the 'J-GBF Nature-Positive Declaration'. In October 2023, Nagoya City became the first designated city to make a nature-positive declaration. By March 2024, 28 organisations had made nature-positive declarations. At the second general assembly of the J-GBF, held in September 2023, a Nature-Positive Action Plan was announced. In October 2023, the J-GBF issued a press release calling on companies, local governments, NGOs, and other actors to issue and register nature-positive declarations that state an aim to achieve nature positivity.

To promote the nature-positive goal, the Ministry of the Environment announced daidaraposie, a cartoon character. Daidaraposie was created by Kiyokazu Motoyama and is based on Daidarabotchi, a figure in Japanese mythology. It was announced in October 2023 on the same day as the call for nature-positive declarations was made by the J-GBF and followed a call for public submissions earlier that year. The aim is for the character to be used to promote the nature-positive goal, with the government allowing free use "on posters, flyers, pamphlets, pop advertisements, business cards, websites, and other media that contribute to the dissemination and awareness of nature positivity, and are created to publicize the efforts being made by all local governments, companies, organizations, and individuals that aim to be nature positive."

The Japanese government is also a member of the G7 Alliance on Nature Positive Economies, along with other Japanese environmental initiatives and businesses: Keidanren Nature Conservation Council, Japanese Business Initiative for Biodiversity, Syneco, Sumitomo Chemical, Karatsu Farm & Food, Taisei Corporation, and the IUCN Japan National Committee.

=== United Kingdom ===
In June 2021, the government of the United Kingdom committed to a nature-positive future in response to the findings of the Dasgupta Review on The Economics of Biodiversity and as part of the wider commitment made by G7 member states at the 47th summit in Carbis Bay, Cornwall. The UK government later joined the G7 Alliance on Nature Positive Economies. when it was established after the 49th G7 summit. Since then, the nature-positive goal has been discussed in Parliament, including in both the House of Commons and House of Lords in 2024, as well as in the Environmental Audit Committee as part of an inquiry into the role of natural capital in the green economy. However, the UK is yet to make a legally-binding commitment to achieving the nature-positive goal.

Targets for achieving the nature-positive goal were set in the 2023 'Environmental Improvement Plan', published by the Department for Environment, Food, and Rural Affairs. This includes objectives for a nature positive food system and determining investment pathways for key sectors to make the transition to a nature positive economy. However, the Office for Environmental Protection, a regulatory body for environmental protection, said that the government was "largely off track" to meet the targets this plan set out in a progress report published in January 2024.

In September 2021, Nature Positive 2030 was published by the five statutory nature conservation bodies of the UK: the Joint Nature Conservation Committee, Natural England, Natural Resources Wales, NatureScot and the Northern Ireland Environment Agency. This includes two reports, a summary and an evidence report. Nature Positive 2030 sets out priority actions to achieve the nature positive goal, such as deploying nature-based solutions, improving management of protected areas, and developing a market for green finance to support nature recovery. The report was praised by Edwin Poots, Environment Minister at the time. It received support from almost 100 companies.

The UK government has also been called on by the Wildlife Trusts to raise its ambition for nature positive development through the Biodiversity Net Gain policy. The RSPB, a charity dedicated to the conservation of birds in the UK, has called for a nature-positive economy. Climate Cymru, RSPB Cymru, and Wales Environment Link have called for a Nature Positive Bill in Wales. In January 2024, a white paper was issued by the Welsh government. The paper set out proposals to introduce a bill to the Senedd (Wales' devolved parliament) that would introduce a statutory nature positive target for biodiversity.

==== Scotland ====
The devolved Scottish Government made a commitment to be nature positive by 2030 in its 'Scottish Biodiversity Strategy to 2045', published in December 2022 and later updated in September 2023. The Strategy sets out priority actions to achieve the nature positive goal and is part of Scotland's Biodiversity Delivery Framework (BDF). The BDF includes the Scottish Biodiversity Strategy to 2045 and 4 other elements: a Natural Environment Bill, delivery plans, an investment plan, and a reporting framework.

== See also ==
- Biodiversity loss
- Convention on Biological Diversity
- Kunming-Montreal Global Biodiversity Framework
- No net loss environmental policy
