= David Obura =

UN biodiversity chair

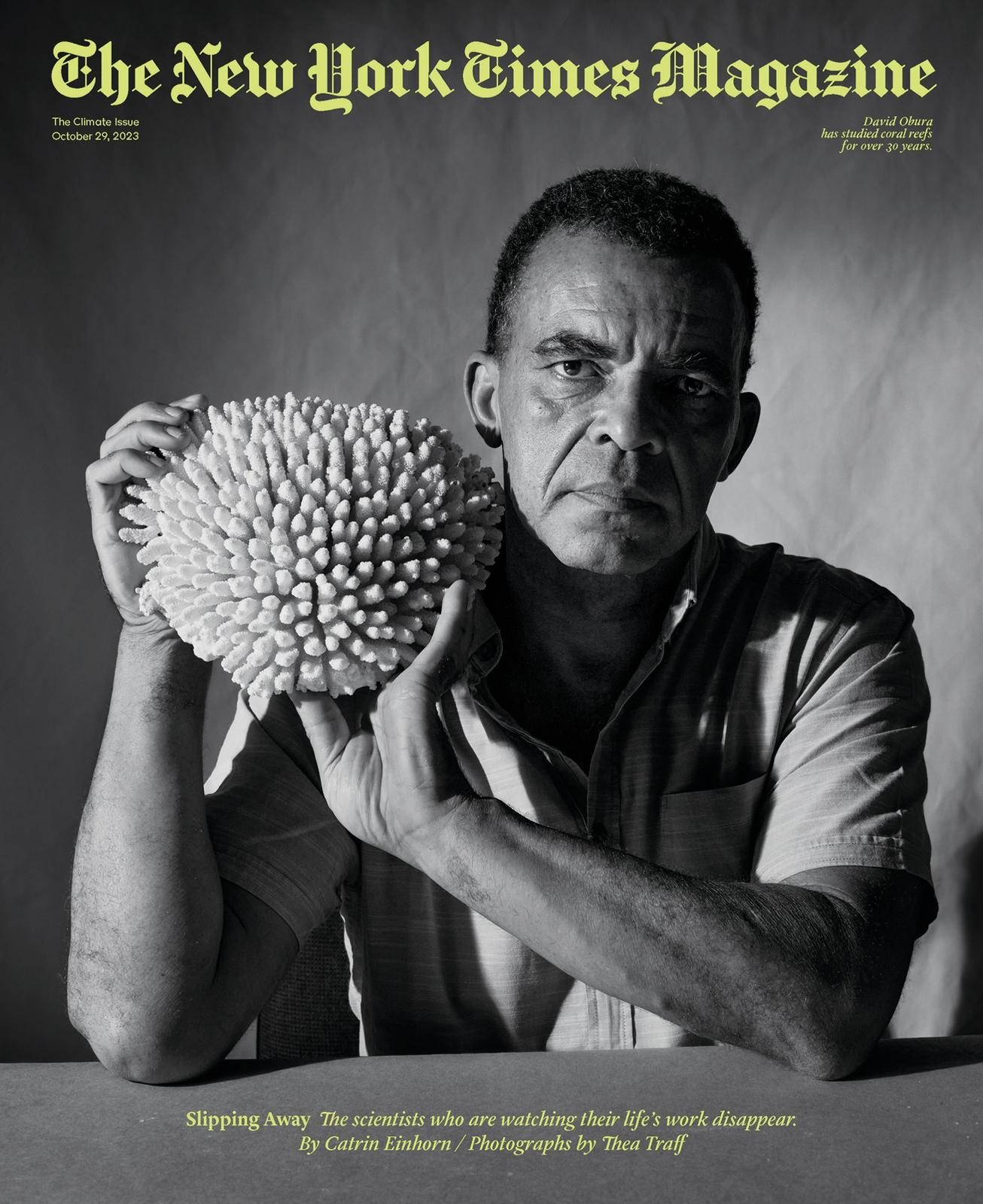

David Obura (born 1966) is a Kenyan marine ecologist. He is a founding director of Coastal Oceans Research and Development—Indian Ocean (CORDIO) East Africa. On 4 September 2023, he was appointed as the chair of the Intergovernmental Science-Policy Platform on Biodiversity and Ecosystem Services. As the head of IPBES, which addresses status and trends of biodiversity, and its support (contributions) to economic and societal benefits, he aims to expand the platform’s reach and ensure that its findings and policy recommendations are seen by decision-makers in all sectors of society, including governments, businesses, and civil society.

== Education and early career ==
Obura was born on August 3, 1966 and grew up in Nairobi, Kenya. He attended varied primary schools, and secondary school at Strathmore College, Nairobi, completing 'O' levels in 1982. From there he studied for the International Baccalaureate at the Lester B. Pearson United World College of the Pacific from 1983-1985. He obtained a Bachelor's degree cum Laude at Harvard University (1985-1989), before going on to the University of Miami's Rosenstiel School of Marine and Atmospheric Science, graduating with a PhD in May 1995. Both his undergraduate and PhD theses were conducted on coral reefs in Kenya, the latter focused on sedimentation and stress resistance of coral reefs in the Malindi-Watamu Marine National Parks.

During his studies, learning to SCUBA dive in the Canadian/US Pacific Northwest, early coral reef introduction in Jamaica, a summer course in Hawaii and assisting colleagues in their coral reef research in the Galapagos Marine Park set broad horizons on biodiversity, conservation and sustainability challenges in tropical regions.

Obura started working on coral reefs in East Africa in 1997, and soon after that joined the CORDIO project in 1999. He was a Founding Director of the non-profit company CORDIO East Africa (Coastal Ocean Research and Development in the Indian Ocean, East Africa), headquartered in Mombasa, which continues CORDIO activities to date across the ten countries of the Western Indian Ocean - Comoros, Kenya, Madagascar, Mauritius, Mozambique, Seychelles, Somalia, South Africa, Tanzania and in French Territories in the region. Other than Eastern Africa, he has studied coral reefs in Jamaica and Hawaii, and spent 6 years studying and promoting the coral reefs of the Phoenix Islands Protected Area in Kiribati, in the Pacific, supporting their designation as a marine World Heritage Site, the largest in the world in its first two years of inception.

== Career ==
Obura's primary research has focused on climate change impacts on coral reefs through heat stress, starting with the 1st global bleaching of corals in 1997-98 and continuing to today. Through this, he focused on the ecological resilience of coral reefs and initiating methods to assess reef resilience, supporting and expanding coral reef monitoring from local to regional scales in the Western Indian Ocean and as part of the Global Coral Reef Monitoring Network (GCRMN). Through engagement in broader biodiversity monitoring processes (the Group on Earth Observations Biodiversity Observing Network (GEOBON) and the UNESCO-Intergovernmental Oceanographic Commission's Global Ocean Observing System (GOOS)) he strengthened engagement of the GCRMN in global biodiversity reporting and indicators of the Kunming-Montreal Global Biodiversity Framework and its monitoring framework (2022-2030). He was the inaugural Chair of the IUCN Coral Specialist Group (started in 2009), and co-led the update of the IUCN Red List of Threatened Species for reef-building corals (completed in 2024), at the same time establishing methods for applying the IUCN Red List of Ecosystems to coral reefs for the WIO region, leading to initiation of a global effort in 2023.

Obura has participated in a wide range of scientific and engagement/policy platforms at regional and global levels, with a focus on addressing sustainability challenges above and beyond a focus on biodiversity and conservation. These include establishing the Northern Mozambique Channel initiative with World Wildlife Fund and national partners, being part of initiatives such as the Global Partnership for Ocean's Blue Ribbon Panel (2013-2014), supporting the High Level Panel on Ocean Sustainability (2019-2022), the Africa-Europe Strategy Group on Ocean Governance (2023-27) and several World Economic Forum bodies, including the Friends of Ocean Action (2023-), Earth Decides (2023-) and the Global Futures Council on Natural Capital (2025-2026). He is on the Earth Commission (2019-), advisory boards for EAT (2025-27) and the Africa National Capital Alliance (2025-), and is on the Think 20 Task Force 5 on Climate Action and Just Energy Transition during South Africa's Presidency of the G20 in 2025. For his coral reef, ocean, and broad engagement, Obura has been awarded: Fellow of the Western Indian Ocean Marine Science Association (2007), Kenyan national honour of Moran of the Burning Spear (MBS) (2021) and the Coral Reef Conservation Award of the International Coral Reef Society (2022).

Obura participated in the Intergovernmental Platform on Biodiversity and Ecosystem Services (IPBES) first as a Coordinating Lead Author of the Global Assessment (2019), then as Section lead in the IPBES/IPCC joint workshop report (2021) until becoming a Co-Chair of the Nexus Assessment, starting in 2022. He stepped down from this role in September 2023 when elected to become Chair of the IPBES platform. Obura is the first holder of the position from Africa, following rotation through Asia-Pacific, Western Europe and Other Governments and Latin America and the Caribbean, and will hold the position until IPBES's 13th Plenary session planned for late 2026.

Political offices
Preceded by Ana María Hernández Salgar	Chair of the IPBES; 2023–	Succeeded by Incumbent
