= International Year of Sustainable Tourism for Development =

2017 was declared as the International Year of Sustainable Tourism for Development by the United Nations General Assembly on 4 December 2015 relating to sustainable tourism toward Sustainable Development Goals (SDGs).
