= BEST Education Network =

Academic network for sustainable tourism education

BEST Education Network (BEST-EN)
- Type: non-profit
- Industry: Travel & tourism
- Founded: 1998
- Headquarters: Australia
- Key people: Gianna Moscardo (Chair); John Pearce (Secretary)
- Website: www.besteducationnetwork.org

BEST Education Network (BEST-EN), headquartered at James Cook University, Australia is an international, inclusive and collaborative network, focusing on the creation and dissemination of knowledge to support education and practice in the field of sustainable tourism.

== History ==
The BEST Education Network emerged from a broader initiative known as Business Enterprises for Sustainable Travel, which was founded in 1998. The primary objective of BEST was to develop and disseminate knowledge in the field of sustainable tourism. In 2003 BEST went through organisational changes and the group overseeing the educational and curriculum aspects of the organisation became independent and renamed itself the BEST Education Network.

== Structure ==
The BEST Education Network is coordinated by an international Executive Committee of academics with expertise in sustainable tourism. The committee is currently chaired by Dr. Gianna Moscardo.

== See also ==
- Sustainable tourism
- Eco-Tourism
