= Kunming-Montreal Global Biodiversity Framework =

International agreement on conservation of biodiversity

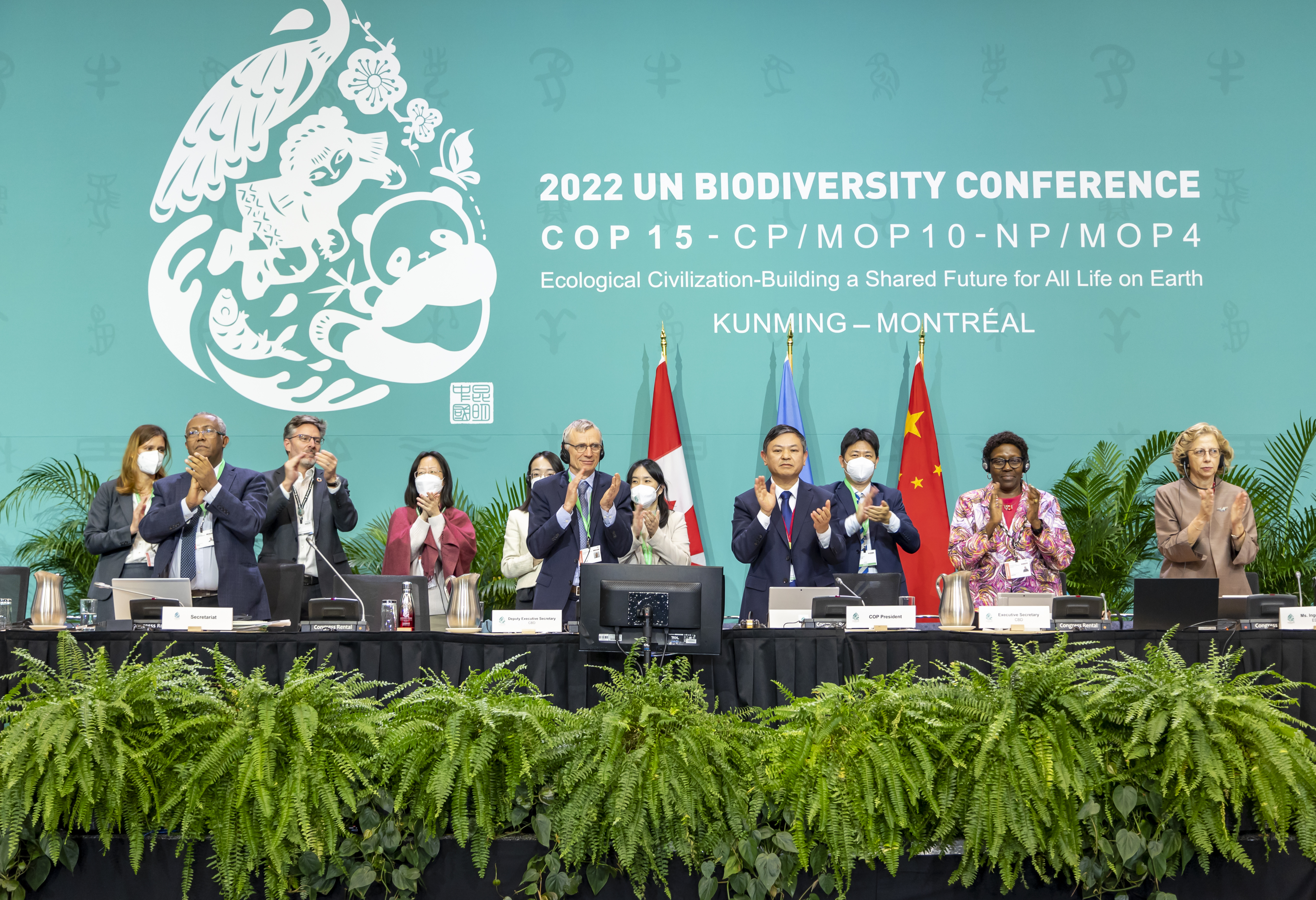
The moment when adoption of the Kunming-Montreal Global Biodiversity Framework was announced on December 19, 2022

The Kunming-Montreal Global Biodiversity Framework (GBF) is an outcome of the 2022 United Nations Biodiversity Conference. Its tentative title had been the "Post-2020 Global Biodiversity Framework". The GBF was adopted by the 15th Conference of Parties (COP15) to the Convention on Biological Diversity (CBD) on 19 December 2022. It has been promoted as a "Paris Agreement for Nature". It is one of a handful of agreements under the auspices of the CBD, and it is the most significant to date. It has been hailed as a "huge, historic moment" and a "major win for our planet and for all of humanity."

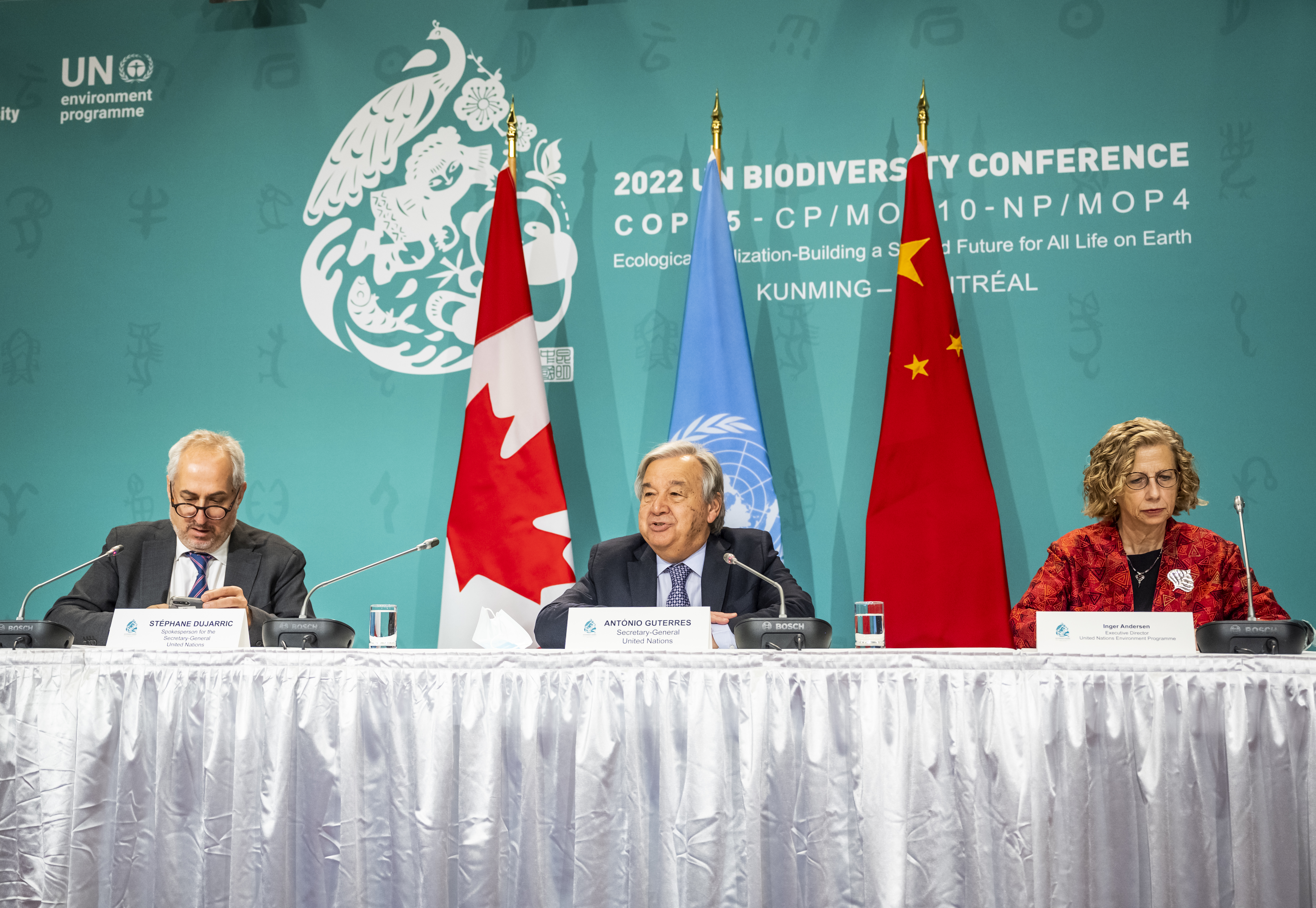
UN Secretary General António Guterres speaking at the 2022 biodiversity conference in Montreal which led to this treaty

The Framework is named after two cities, Kunming, which was scheduled to be the host city for COP15 in October 2020 but postponed and subsequently relinquished the hosting duties due to China's COVID policy, and Montreal, which is the seat of the Convention on Biological Diversity Secretariat and stepped in to host COP15 after Kunming's cancellation.

== Background ==
Human activities around the planet have been causing a crisis of biodiversity loss around the globe. This phenomenon has been known as the Holocene extinction, which is the sixth mass extinction event in the Earth's history. The decline in nature threatens the survival of a million species and impacts billions of people.

Due to increasing awareness of the biodiversity crisis, there was pressure from citizens and investors around the world to take action to address the interlinked crises of climate change and biodiversity loss. Previous agreements, including the Aichi Biodiversity Targets, had largely failed to achieve their targets for biodiversity loss.

In the lead up to the adoption of the GBF, it was hoped that the GBF would act as an ambitious, science-based, and comprehensive sister agreement to the Paris Agreement - an international agreement for climate change under the auspices of the United Nations Framework Convention on Climate Change. COP15, the summit where the GBF was adopted, was described by Elizabeth Maruma Mrema (Executive Secretary of the Convention on Biological Diversity) as a "Paris moment for biodiversity".

== Goals and targets ==
The GBF contains four global goals ("Kunming-Montreal Global Goals for 2050") and 23 targets ("Kunming-Montreal 2030 Global Targets").

The four goals are:

1. The integrity, resilience, and connectivity of ecosystems is maintained, enhanced, or restored, substantially increasing the area of natural ecosystems by 2050, and that human-induced extinction of threatened species is halted, and that by 2050, extinction rate and risk of all species are reduced tenfold, and the abundance of native wild species is increased to healthy and resilient levels; and that the genetic diversity within populations of wild and domesticated species, is maintained, safeguarding their adaptive potential.
2. Biodiversity is sustainably used and managed and nature's contributions to people, including ecosystem functions and services, are valued, maintained and enhanced, with those currently in decline being restored, supporting the achievement of sustainable development, for the benefit of present and future generations by 2050.
3. The monetary and non-monetary benefits from the utilization of genetic resources, and digital sequence information on genetic resources, and of traditional knowledge associated with genetic resources, as applicable, are shared fairly and equitably, including, as appropriate with indigenous peoples and local communities, and substantially increased by 2050, while ensuring traditional knowledge associated with genetic resources is appropriately protected, thereby contributing to the conservation and sustainable use of biodiversity, in accordance with internationally agreed access and benefit-sharing instruments
4. Adequate means of implementation, including financial resources, capacity-building, technical and scientific cooperation, and access to and transfer of technology to fully implement the Kunming-Montreal global biodiversity framework are secured and equitably accessible to all Parties, especially developing countries, in particular the least developed countries and small island developing States, as well as countries with economies in transition, progressively closing the biodiversity finance gap of $700 billion per year, and aligning financial flows with the Kunming-Montreal Global Biodiversity Framework and the 2050 Vision for Biodiversity.

The 23 targets are categorized into three areas as:

1. Reducing threats to biodiversity.
2. Meeting people's needs through sustainable use and benefit-sharing.
3. Tools and solutions for implementation and mainstreaming.

"Target 3" is especially referred to as the "30 by 30" target. It succeeds the Strategic Plan for Biodiversity 2011-2020 (including the Aichi Biodiversity Targets). It aims for governments to designate 30% of Earth's terrestrial and aquatic area as protected areas by 2030. As part of the target, countries must stop subsidizing activities that destroy wilderness, such as mining and industrial fishing. To effectively protect endemic biodiversity, the expansion or development of protected areas should be guided by key species-distribution patterns. This target also recognizes Indigenous land as conservation pathways, but has been criticized for not incorporating Indigenous and community conserved areas into its measures for success.

In parallel to the development of these goals and targets, the concept of nature-positive emerged as a global societal goal for nature that mirrors the mission and vision of the GBF. Nature-positive refers to the goal to halt and reverse nature loss by 2030, and to achieve nature recovery by 2050, while the Global Biodiversity Framework also aims to halt and reverse the loss of biodiversity to begin the road to nature recovery. Since the implementation of the GBF, nature-positive has played a role in mainstreaming nature throughout businesses and governance systems to achieve the targets of the framework.

These targets have been criticized for vagueness, due to a lack measurable indicators for progress or accountability. Challenges with the GBF are expected to arise due with unequal implementation due to a lack of specificity. David Obura, Chair of the IPBES, warned the framework may result in "business-as-usual" if countries choose to ignore underlying drivers of biodiversity loss in favour of meeting specific, achievable targets.

== Implications ==
The implementation of the GBF will likely lead to the following effects according to the United Nations Environment Programme Finance Initiative:

1. Mandatory nature-related disclosure of data. Companies will be required to disclose their impacts on biodiversity and the natural world.
2. Increasing nature-positive financial flows. Banks and financial institutions will have to invest in projects that restore nature.
3. Biodiversity targets will form a mandatory part of corporate governance.
4. Central banks and their governing institutions will need to address the risks stemming from nature loss as a core part of their mandates.
5. The GBF will enable international policy alignment in terms of protecting nature.

The GBF is not a legally binding treaty, but it is expected to have a major impact in countries around the world as they endeavor to meet their targets, through the development of new plans and regulations. For example, protected areas will be expanded and subsidies for ecologically destructive activities such as fishing will have to be redirected.

Progress towards national targets has been under review at COP16. By the summit's end, just 44 out of 196 parties had come up with new biodiversity plans.

In May 2024, United Nations Environmental Programme (UNEP) and China launched the Kunming Biodiversity Fund, with China committing $230 million USD for projects supporting GBF goals in developing countries.

In 2024, Boran and Pettorelli wrote a policy paper in the Journal of Applied Ecology outlining the need for the Kunming-Montreal Framework to be better aligned with the Paris Agreement.

== See also ==
- Paris Agreement
- High Seas Treaty
- Nature-positive
