= Intergovernmental Science-Policy Platform on Biodiversity and Ecosystem Services =

Intergovernmental science and policy organization

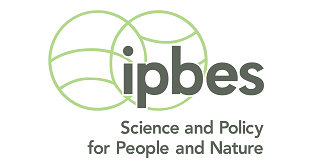
- Abbreviation: IPBES
- Formation: 2012
- Type: Independent intergovernmental platform
- Legal status: Active
- Headquarters: Bonn, Germany
- Members: 152
- Chair: David Obura
- Executive Secretary: Luthando Dziba
- Multidisciplinary Expert Panel Co-Chair: Rafael Calderón Contreras
- Multidisciplinary Expert Panel Co-Chair: Kyung Ah Koo
- Website: www.ipbes.net

The Intergovernmental Science-Policy Platform on Biodiversity and Ecosystem Services (IPBES) is an independent intergovernmental organization established by governments in 2012 to strengthen the science-policy interface for biodiversity and ecosystem services for the conservation and sustainable use of biodiversity, long-term human well-being and sustainable development. It serves a similar role to the Intergovernmental Panel on Climate Change (IPCC), though in addition to undertaking scientific assessments, IPBES also supports efforts to generate new knowledge, build capacity and promote the development and use of policy support tools. In keeping with widespread linguistic convention, the acronym is officially pronounced as "ip-bes" — "ip" as in "hip" and "bes" as in "best".

In January 2026, the United States announced its withdrawal from the organization.

== Establishment and Meetings ==
The platform was formally established following extensive international negotiations involving governments, scientists, and United Nations bodies.

IPBES was created to strengthen the interface between scientific research and policymaking on biodiversity.

In 2010 a resolution by the 65th session of the United Nations General Assembly urged the United Nations Environment Programme to convene a plenary meeting to establish IPBES. In 2013 an initial conceptual framework was adopted for the prospective IPBES plenary.

IPBES parties meet every one to two years in sessions designated as Plenaries.

== First Global Assessment (2019) ==
From 29 April to 4 May 2019, representatives of the 132 IPBES members met in Paris, France, to discuss the Global Assessment Report on Biodiversity and Ecosystem Services and to adopt its summary for policymakers (SPM). On 6 May 2019, the 40-page document was released, aiming to empower policymakers with the knowledge and evidence to make better decisions when developing policies and taking actions for the benefit of humans and nature.

The IPBES Conceptual Framework • Explanation of arrows (dotted arrows = important, but not the main focus of IPBES): • Arrow 1 = A society's achievement of good quality of life directly influences institutions and governance systems and other indirect drivers • Arrow 2 = Institutions and governance systems and other indirect drivers are the root causes of the direct anthropogenic drivers that affect nature • Arrow 3 = Direct drivers of change are the immediate cause of changes in nature • Arrow 4 = Direct drivers of change affect the supply of nature's contributions to people • Arrows 5, 6, and 7 = Institutions and governance systems and other indirect drivers affect the interactions and balance between nature and anthropogenic assets • Arrow 8 = Nature's contributions to people affect how people achieve a good quality of life • Arrow 9 = Direct drivers of change can have direct impacts on the quality of life • Arrow 10 = Anthropogenic assets directly affect the possibility of achieving a good quality of life through the provision of and access to food, water, energy and livelihood security; health, social relationships, equity, spirituality, and cultural identity

== 2020 report ==
On October 29, 2020, the organization issued a preliminary report through Zenodo on its workshop, held virtually on 27–31 July 2020, that proposes a plan for international cooperation to lower risks for pandemics. Lowering the frequency and severity of pandemics through the implementation of worldwide policies is the objective of the organization. An article on the report was published by Medical News Today on November 7, 2020, that explicates information in the report.

The report also emphasized that preventing pandemics through biodiversity conservation and reduced environmental degradation is more cost-effective than responding after outbreaks occur.

== Nature's contributions to people ==
Nature's Contributions to People (NCPs): Mapping of the 18 NCP reporting categories used in IPBES assessments by group

The 5th IPBES Plenary in 2017 noted that the concept of nature's contributions to people would be used in current and future IPBES assessments. The concept of "nature's contributions to people" has since replaced the use of the phrase "nature's benefits to people" that had been used in the conceptual framework as initially adopted in 2013. This change was met with objection from some scientists, who worried that the new term would be confusing and that NCPs were not significantly different from ecosystem services.

The concept of nature's contributions to people was introduced to better incorporate diverse worldviews, including indigenous and local knowledge systems, into biodiversity assessments.

== Cooperation with IPCC ==
In June 2021, IPBES and IPCC released a co-sponsored workshop report on biodiversity and climate change. The workshop produced a summary report covering outcomes, and a 250-page scientific outcome report.

Tackling either climate change or biodiversity loss in isolation can result in ineffective or incomplete solutions, since the two issues are deeply interconnected. Efforts to address one problem may inadvertently exacerbate the other, if their links are overlooked. Therefore, integrating both challenges is crucial for creating strategies that are both effective and sustainable.

== Major published assessments ==
- Pollination
- Scenarios and models
- Regional assessments
- Land degradation and restoration
- Values assessment
- Sustainable use of wild species
- Invasive alien species
- Nexus
- Transformative Change
- Business and Biodiversity Report: Methodological assessment of the impact and dependence of business on biodiversity and nature's contributions to people

== Upcoming assessments ==
- Monitoring assessment: A methodological assessment on monitoring biodiversity and nature's contributions to people
- Spatial planning and connectivity assessment
- Second global assessment: The second global assessment of biodiversity and ecosystem services

== IPBES 11 (2024) ==
=== Nexus Assessment ===
The Nexus Assessment is a new report by IPBES, approved on 17 December 2024. It looks at how biodiversity, water, food and health are connected, and is the most ambitious scientific assessment of these links. It looks at different ways to deal with the problem, to make most benefits across the five 'nexus elements': biodiversity, water, food, health and climate change.

=== Transformative Change Assessment ===
The IPBES Assessment Report on the Underlying Causes of Biodiversity Loss and the Determinants of Transformative Change and Options for Achieving the 2050 Vision for Biodiversity – also known as the Transformative Change Assessment – was approved on 18 December 2024. It builds on the 2019 IPBES Global Assessment Report, which found that the only way to achieve global development goals is through transformative change.

== Awards ==
=== Gulbenkian Prize for Humanity (2022) ===
In October 2022, the IPBES and the IPCC shared the Gulbenkian Prize for Humanity, because the two intergovernmental organisations "produce scientific knowledge, alert society, and inform decision-makers to make better choices for combatting climate change and the loss of biodiversity".

=== Blue Planet Prize (2024) ===
The Blue Planet Prize is awarded annually to individuals and organisations that have demonstrated exceptional accomplishments in scientific research and its practical applications. These achievements have contributed to the identification of solutions to pressing global environmental challenges.

The 2024 laureates include the IPBES, recognised as "the leading global authority on the state of knowledge and science about biodiversity, ecosystem services and nature's contributions to people".

== See also ==
- Convention on Biological Diversity
- Ecosystem service
- Intergovernmental Panel on Climate Change
- Intergovernmental Science-Policy Panel on Chemicals, Waste and Pollution
- System of Integrated Environmental and Economic Accounting
