= Nature reserve =

Protected area for flora, fauna or features of geological interest

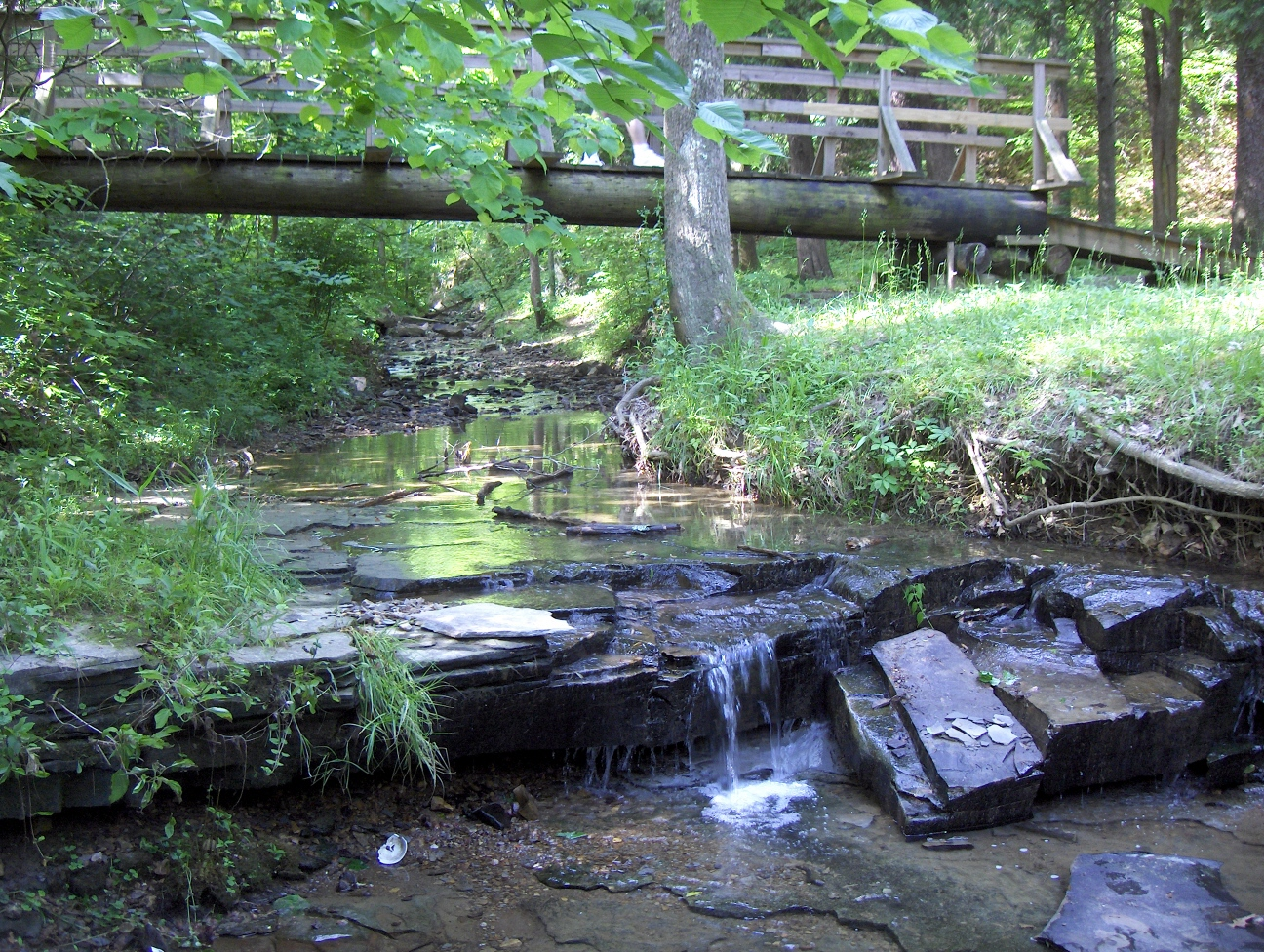
Bee Lick Creek in the Jefferson Memorial Forest, a National Audubon Society wildlife refuge

A nature reserve (also known as a wildlife refuge, wildlife preserve, wildlife reserve, sanctuary, biosphere reserve or bioreserve, natural or nature preserve, or nature conservation area) is a protected area of importance for flora, fauna, funga, or features of geological or other special interest, which is reserved and managed for purposes of conservation and to provide special opportunities for study or research. They may be designated by government institutions in some countries, or by private landowners, such as charities and research institutions. Nature reserves fall into different IUCN categories depending on the level of protection afforded by local laws. Normally it is more strictly protected than a nature park. Various jurisdictions may use other terminology, such as ecological protection area or private protected area in legislation and in official titles of the reserves.

== History ==
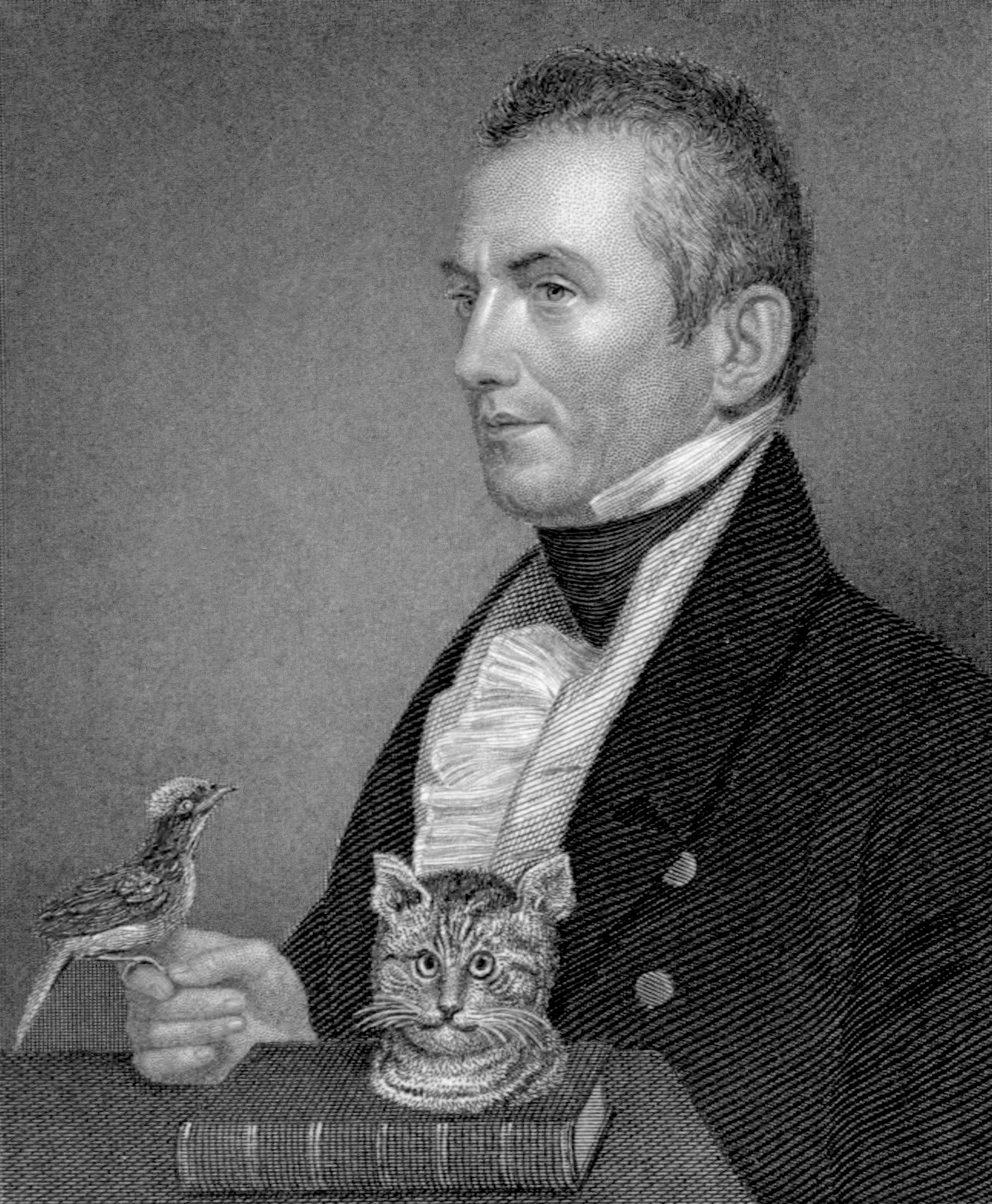
Charles Waterton established the first nature reserve in 1821.

Cultural practices that roughly equate to the establishment and maintenance of reserved areas for animals date back to antiquity, with King Devanampiya Tissa of Sri Lanka establishing Mihintale wildlife sanctuary, one of the world's earliest animal sanctuaries, in the 3rd-century-BC Anuradhapura Ancient Kingdom. Early reservations often had a religious underpinning, such as the 'evil forest' areas of West Africa which were forbidden to humans, who were threatened with spiritual attack if they went there. Sacred areas taboo from human entry to fishing and hunting are known by many ancient cultures worldwide.

The world's first modern nature reserve was established in 1821 by the naturalist and explorer Charles Waterton around his estate in Walton Hall, West Yorkshire. He spent £9000 on the construction of a three-mile long, 9 ft tall wall to enclose his park against poachers. He tried to encourage bird life by planting trees and hollowing out trunks for owls to nest in.

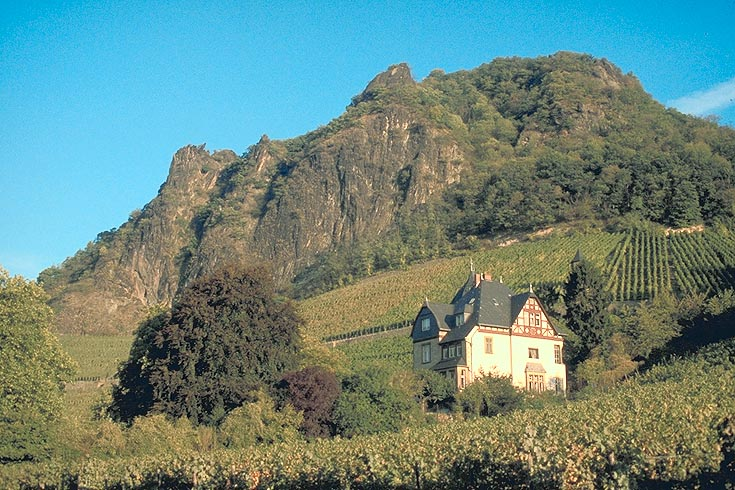
Drachenfels (Siebengebirge)

Waterton invented artificial nest boxes to house starlings, western jackdaws and sand martins; and unsuccessfully attempted to introduce little owls from Italy. Waterton allowed local people access to his reserve and was described by David Attenborough as "one of the first people anywhere to recognise not only that the natural world was of great importance but that it needed protection as humanity made more and more demands on it".

Drachenfels was protected as the first state-designated nature reserve in modern-day Germany; the site was bought by the Prussian State in 1836 to protect it from further quarrying.

The first major nature reserve was Yellowstone National Park in Wyoming, United States, followed by the Royal National Park near Sydney, Australia, and the Barguzin Nature Reserve of Imperial Russia, the first of zapovedniks set up by a federal government entirely for the scientific study of nature.

== Around the world ==
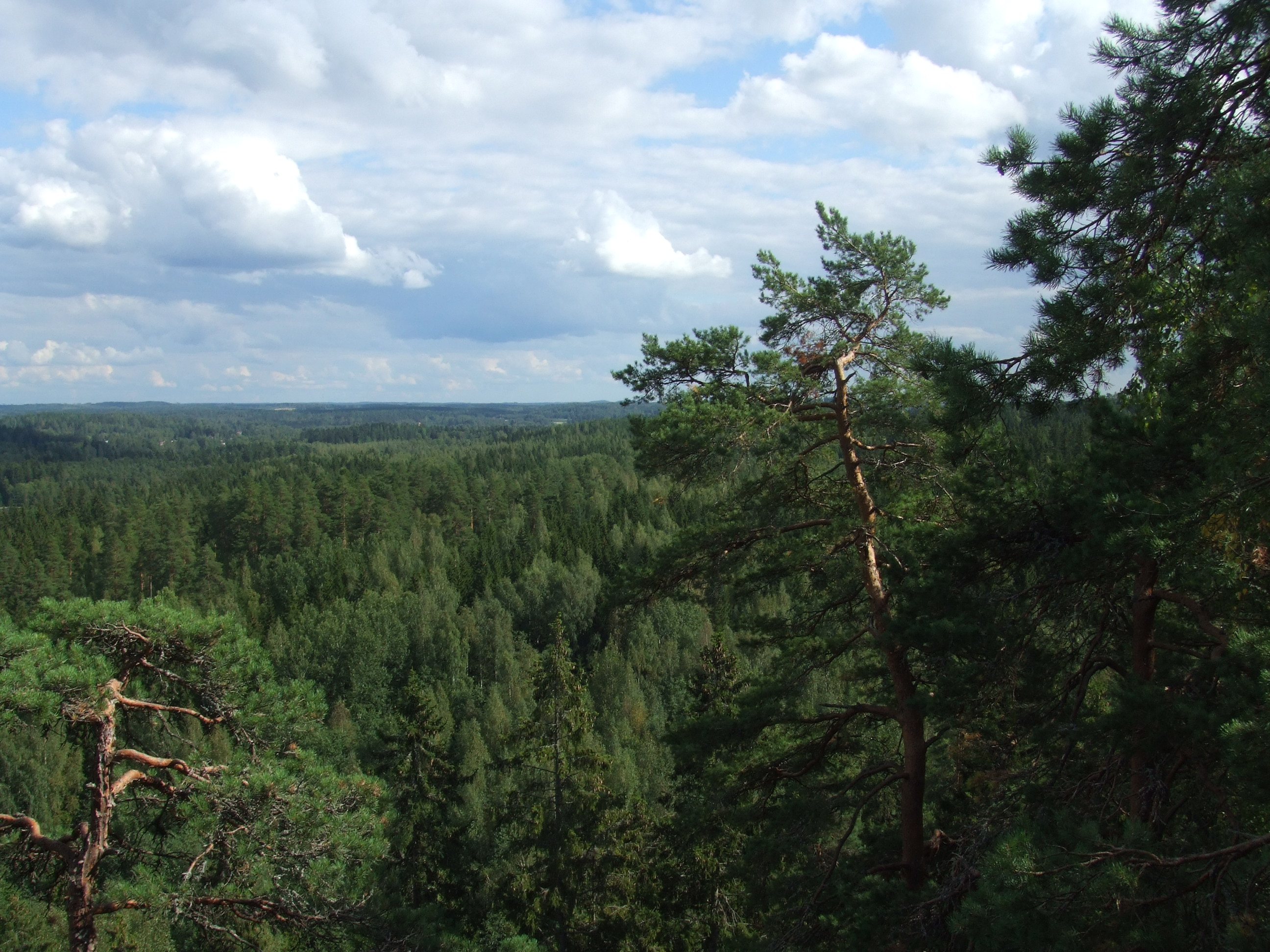
A forest of the Aulanko Reserve in Hämeenlinna, Kanta-Häme, Finland

There are several national and international organizations that oversee the numerous non-profit animal sanctuaries and refuges to provide a general system for sanctuaries to follow. Among them, the American Sanctuary Association monitors and aids in various facilities to care for exotic wildlife. The number of sanctuaries has substantially increased over the past few years.

=== Australia ===
In Australia, a nature reserve is the title of a type of protected area used in the jurisdictions of the Australian Capital Territory, New South Wales, Tasmania and Western Australia. The term "nature reserve" is defined in the relevant statutes used in those states and territories rather than by a single national statute. As of 2016, 1767 out of a total of 11044 protected areas listed within the Australian National Reserve System used the term "nature reserve" in their names.

=== Brazil ===
In Brazil, nature reserves are classified by the National System of Nature Conservation Units as ecological stations (Portuguese: estações ecológicas) or biological reserves (Portuguese: reservas biológicas). Their main objectives are preserving fauna and flora and other natural attributes, excluding direct human interference. Visits are allowed only with permission, and only for educational or scientific purposes. Changes to the ecosystems in both types of reserve are allowed to restore and preserve the natural balance, biological diversity and natural ecological processes. Ecological stations are also allowed to change the environment within strictly defined limits (e.g. affecting no more than three percent of the area or 1,500 hectares (3,700 acres), whichever is less) for the purpose of scientific research. A wildlife reserve in Brazil is also protected, and hunting is not allowed, but products and by-products from research may be sold.

Wildlife refuges in Brazil have as their objective the protection of natural flora and fauna where conditions are assured for the existence and reproduction of species or communities of the local flora and the resident or migratory fauna. The refuges can consist of privately owned land, as long as the objectives of the unit are compatible with the landowners' usage of the land and natural resources. Public visits are subject to the conditions and restrictions established by the management plan of the unit and are subject to authorisation by and regulations of the main administrative and scientific research body.

=== Canada ===
The Niagara Escarpment and the St. Lawrence River in Ontario are among the 18 nature reserves recognized by UNESCO in Canada.

As a federal government, Canada recognizes 55 National Wildlife Areas, containing species of ecological significance. This area is protected by legislation known as the Canada Wildlife Act, which is overseen by the Ministry of Environment and Climate Change. About half of the habitat is marine habitat, and the remainder is terrestrial habitat.

Nature Conservancy Canada, Ducks Unlimited, and Escarpment Biosphere Conservancy, among others, protect nature reserves in Canada as well. As part of Canada's Ecological Gifts Program, these charities protect wilderness on privately owned lands.

=== Egypt ===
There are 30 nature reserves in Egypt which cover 12% of Egyptian land. Those nature reserves were built according to the laws no. 102/1983 and 4/1994 for protection of the Egyptian nature reserve. Egypt announced a plan from to build 40 nature reserves from 1997 to 2017, to help protect the natural resources and the culture and history of those areas. The largest nature reserve in Egypt is Gebel Elba (35,600 square kilometres (13,700 sq mi)) in the southeast, on the Red Sea coast.

=== Eritrea ===
On 16 March 1959, the British established the Yob Wildlife Reserve in northern Eritrea specifically to protect significant populations of Nubian ibex in the area.

=== Europe ===
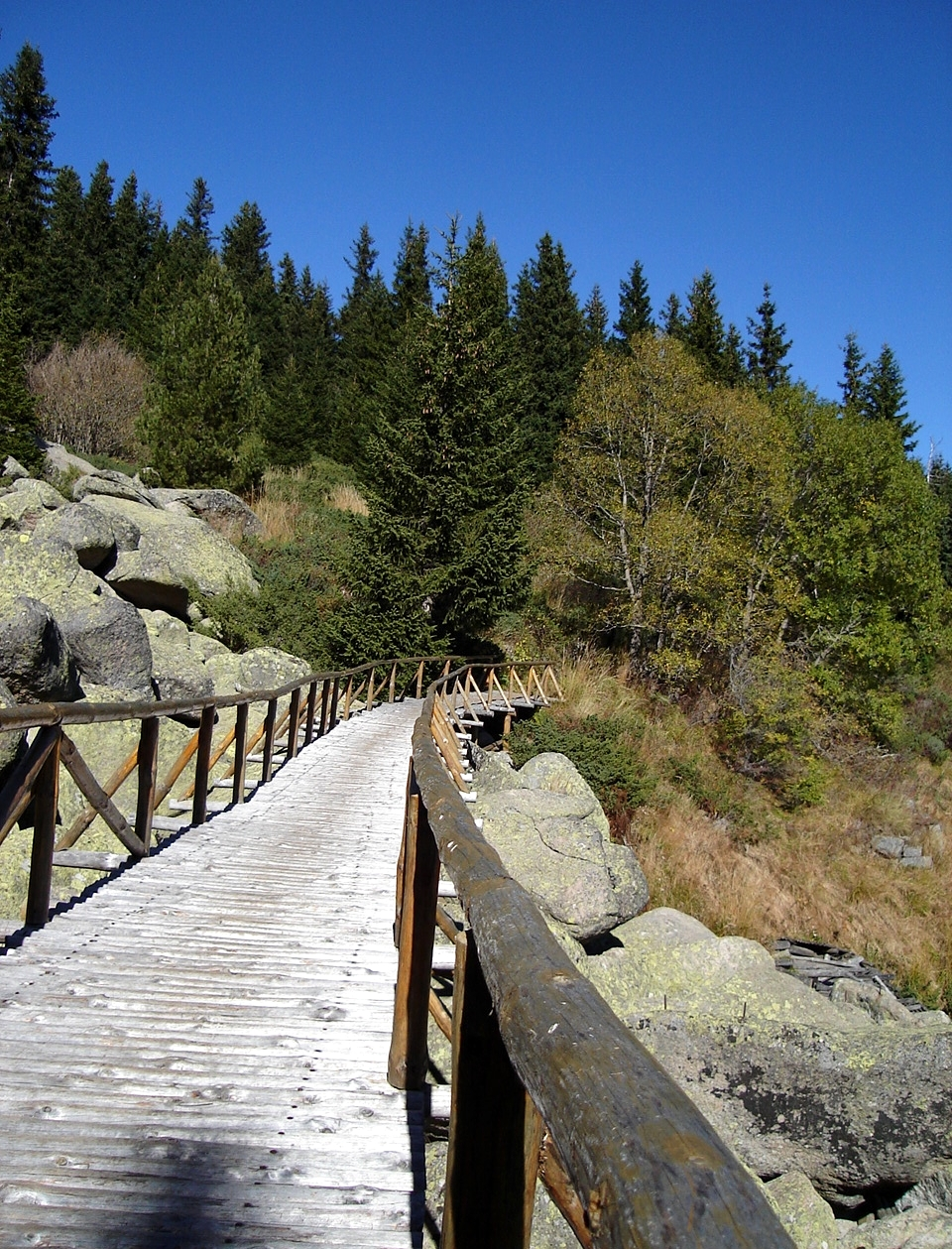
A bridged stone river in Bistrishko Branishte, an early Bulgarian nature reserve established in 1934

==== Denmark ====
Denmark has three national parks and several nature reserves, some of them inside the national park areas. The largest single reserve is Hanstholm Nature Reserve, which covers 40 km^{2} (9,900 acres) and is part of Thy National Park.

==== Sweden ====
In Sweden, there are 30 national parks. The first of them was established in 1909. There are almost 4,000 nature reserves in Sweden. They comprise about 85% of the surface that is protected by the Swedish Environmental Code.

==== Estonia ====
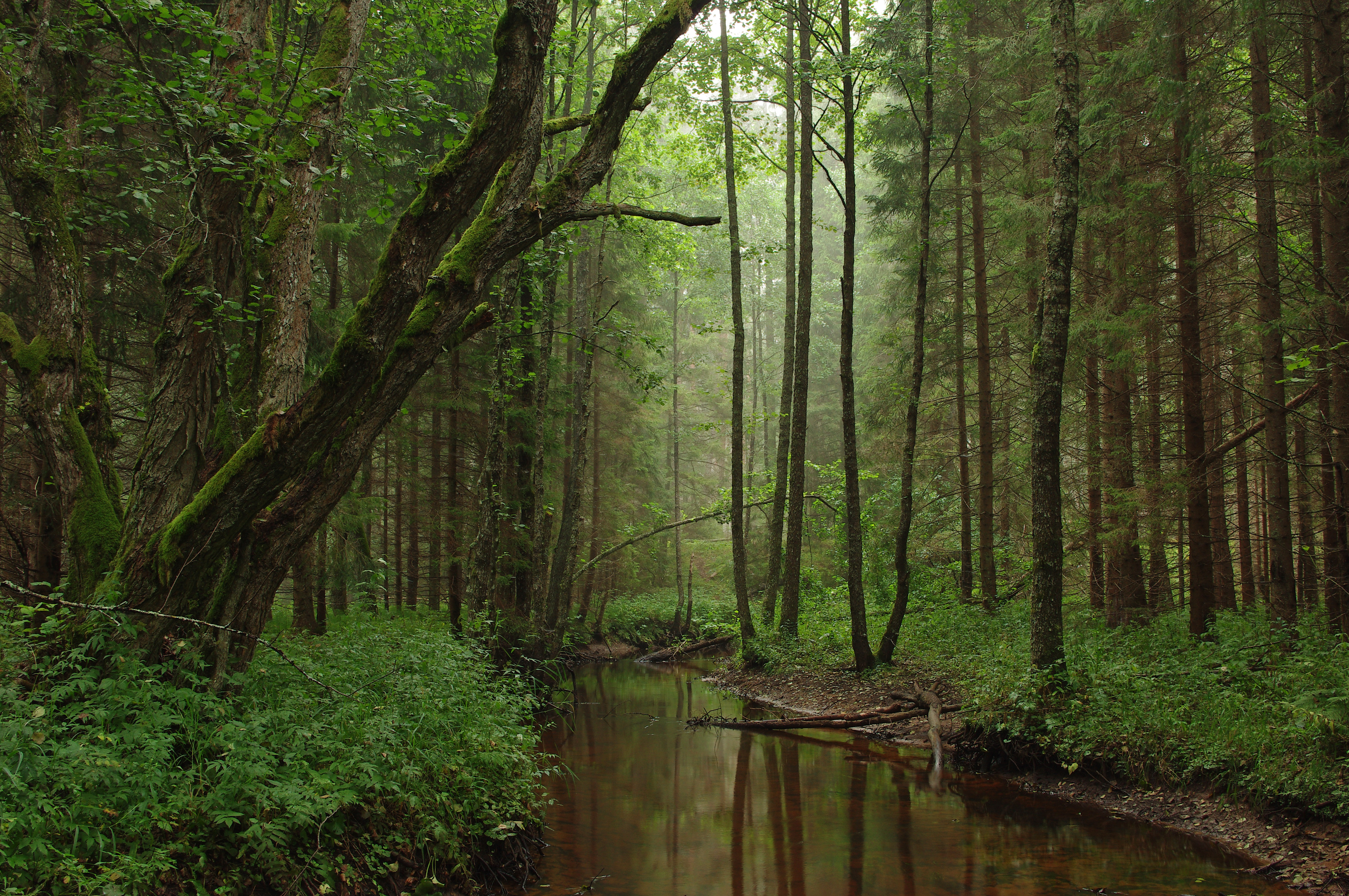
The Tarvasjõgi river at Põhja-Kõrvemaa Nature Reserve in Estonia

In Estonia, there are five national parks, more than 100 nature reserves, and around 130 landscape protection areas. The largest nature reserve in Estonia is Alam-Pedja Nature Reserve, which covers 342 km^{2} (85,000 acres).

==== France ====
As of 2017, France counts 10 national parks, around 50 regional nature parks, and 8 marine parks.

==== Germany ====
In 1995 Germany had 5,314 nature reserves (German: Naturschutzgebiete) covering 6,845 km^{2} (2,643 sq mi), the largest total areas being in Bavaria with 1,416 km^{2} (547 sq mi) and Lower Saxony with 1,275 km^{2} (492 sq mi).

==== Hungary ====
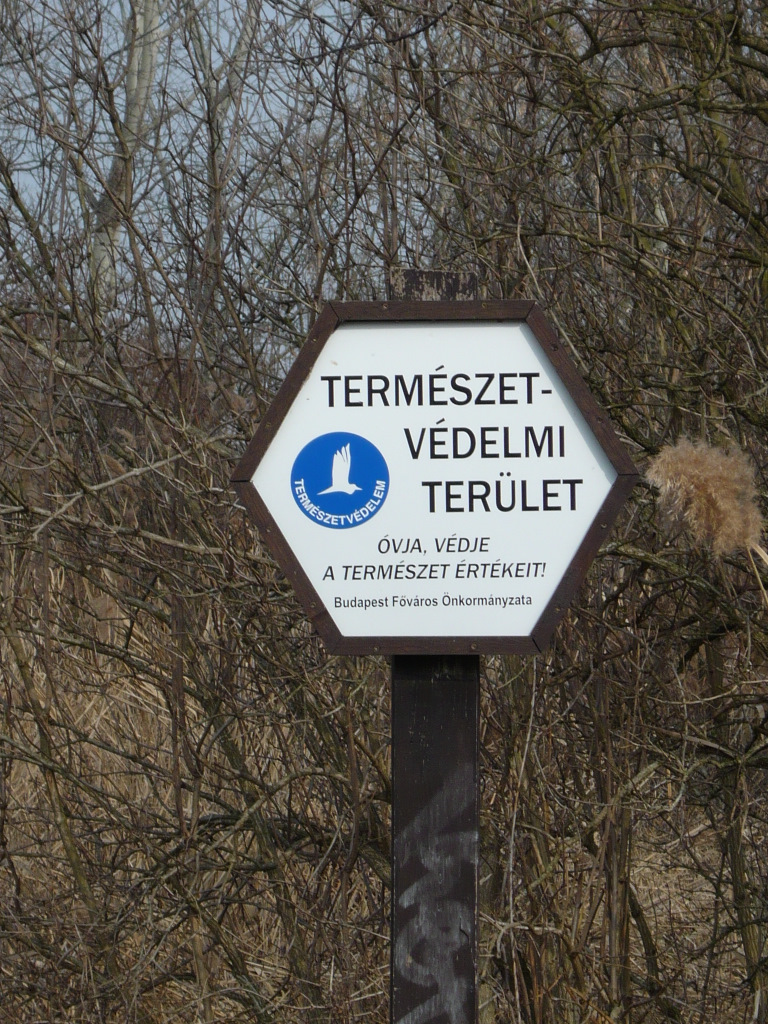
Nature reserve near Budapest, next to Lake Naplás

In Hungary, there are 10 national parks, more than 15 nature reserves and more than 250 protected areas. Hortobágy National Park is the largest continuous natural grassland in Europe and the oldest national park in Hungary. It is situated on the eastern part of Hungary, on the plain of the Alföld. It was established in 1972. There are alkaline grasslands interrupted by marshes. They have a sizable importance because there are the fishponds. One of the most spectacular sights of the park is the autumn migration of cranes. Some famous Hungarian animal species live in Hortobágy National Park, such as the grey cattle, racka long-wool sheep living only in Hungary, Hungarian horses and buffalo. Hortobágy National Park has been a UNESCO World Heritage Site since 1 December 1999.

==== Kosovo ====
In Kosovo, there are 2 national parks, 11 nature reserves, 99 natural monuments and 3 protected landscapes. The national parks are Bjeshkët e Nemuna National Park and Sharr Mountains National Park.

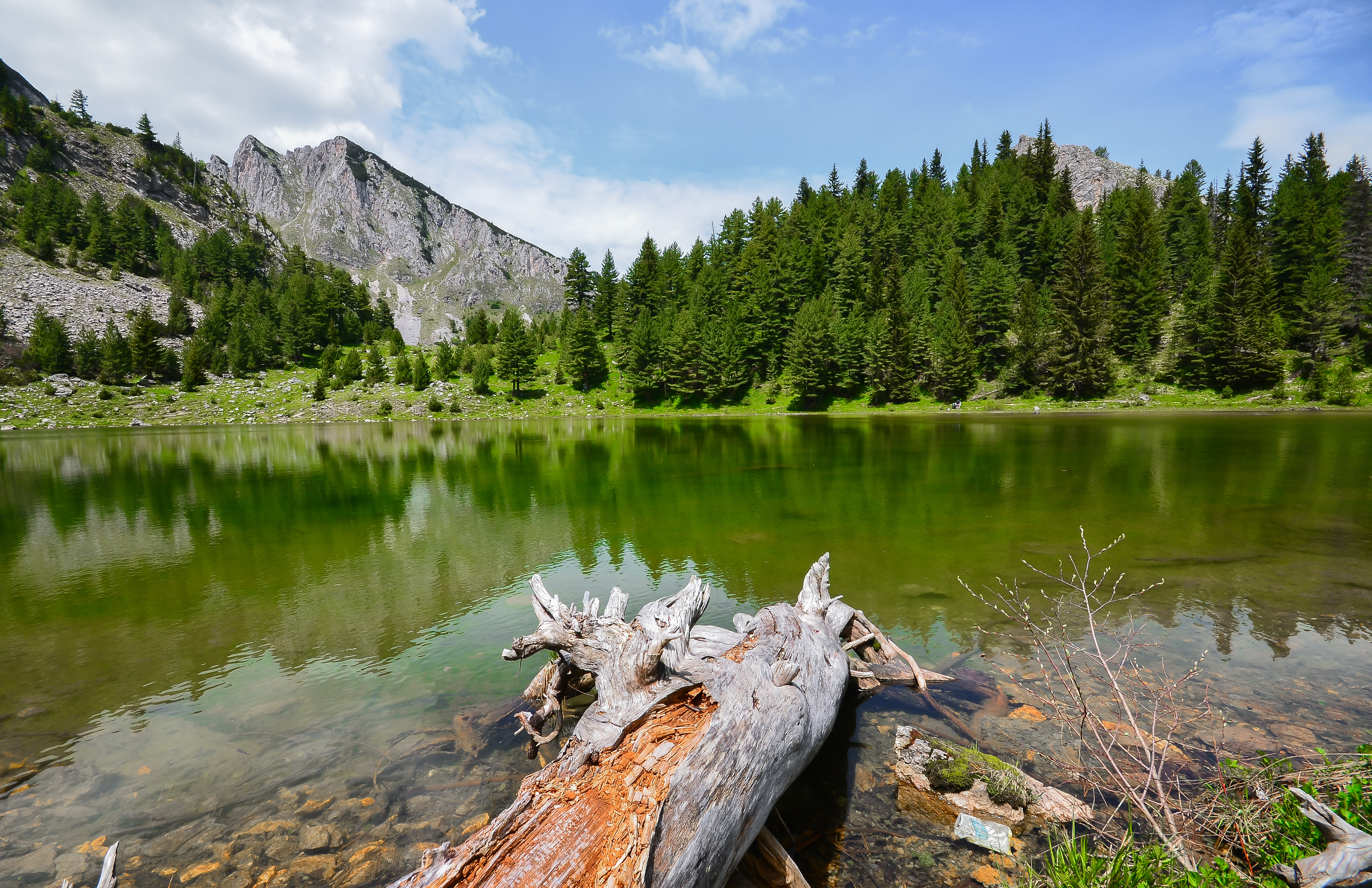
Bjeshkët e Nemuna National Park, one of two national parks in Kosovo

==== Poland ====
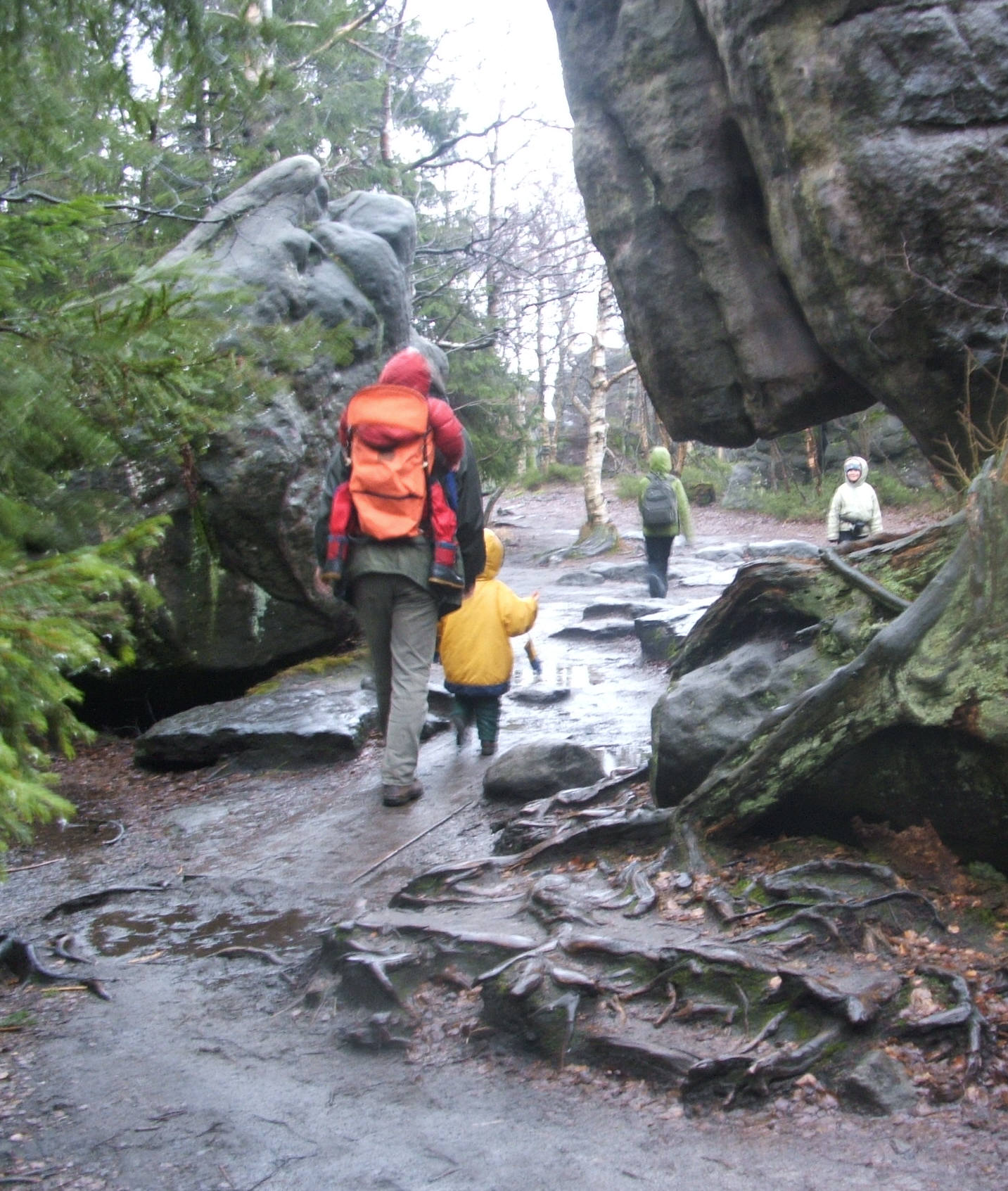
Path on Szczeliniec Wielki, a famous nature reserve in the Stołowe Mountains in SW Poland

As of 2011, Poland has 1469 nature reserves.

==== Portugal ====
Nature reserves are one of the 11 types of protected areas in Portugal. As of 2012, Portugal had a total of 46 protected areas, which represented 6,807.89 km^{2} (2,628.54 sq mi) of land and 463.94 km^{2} (179.13 sq mi) of marine surfaces. Among the protected areas, nine are classified as nature reserve (Portuguese: reserva natural).

==== Romania ====
About 5.18% of the area of Romania has a protected status (12,360 km^{2} (4,770 sq mi)), including the Danube Delta, which makes up half of this area (2.43% of Romania's total area).

==== Spain ====
There are 15 National Parks, and around 90 Natural Parks in Spain. Spain is the country with the most sites listed in the World Network of Biosphere Reserves.

==== Ukraine ====
There are 4 biosphere reserves (two of them are dated 1927 and 1874) and 17 nature reserves in Ukraine, covering 160,000 ha (400,000 acres). Ukraine administers 40 national parks, 2632 habitat management areas, 3025 nature monuments, and 1430 other preservations.

==== United Kingdom ====
There are some differences between the regulations for England, Northern Ireland, Scotland and Wales, which are separately managed.

At the end of March 2004, there were 215 national nature reserves in England with a total area of 879 km^{2} (339 sq mi). The reserves are scattered through England, from Lindisfarne in Northumberland to The Lizard in Cornwall. Nearly every rural county has at least one. Many national nature reserves contain nationally important populations of rare flowers, ferns and mosses, butterflies and other insects, and nesting and wintering birds. Examples include unique alpine plants at Upper Teesdale and the field of snake's head fritillaries at North Meadow, Cricklade, Wiltshire.

There are now over 1,050 local nature reserves in England. They range from windswept coastal headlands, ancient woodlands and flower-rich meadows to former inner-city railways, long-abandoned landfill sites and industrial areas now re-colonized by wildlife. In total, they cover almost 40,000 ha (99,000 acres)—a natural resource which makes an important contribution to England's biodiversity. A good example is Rye Harbour Nature Reserve in East Sussex, where a network of footpaths enables visitors to explore shingle, saltmarsh, saline lagoon, reedbed, and grazing marsh habitats.

Through the Natural Heritage (Scotland) Act 1991 the Scottish Natural Heritage (SNH) was established in 1992 as a government body, responsible to the Scottish Government Ministers and through them to the Scottish Parliament. At 31 March 2008, there were 65 Scottish national nature reserves with a total area of approximately 1,330 km^{2} (510 sq mi). Section 21 of the National Parks and Access to the Countryside Act 1949 gives local authorities the exclusive statutory power to establish a local nature reserve in consultation with the SNH.

=== Iran ===
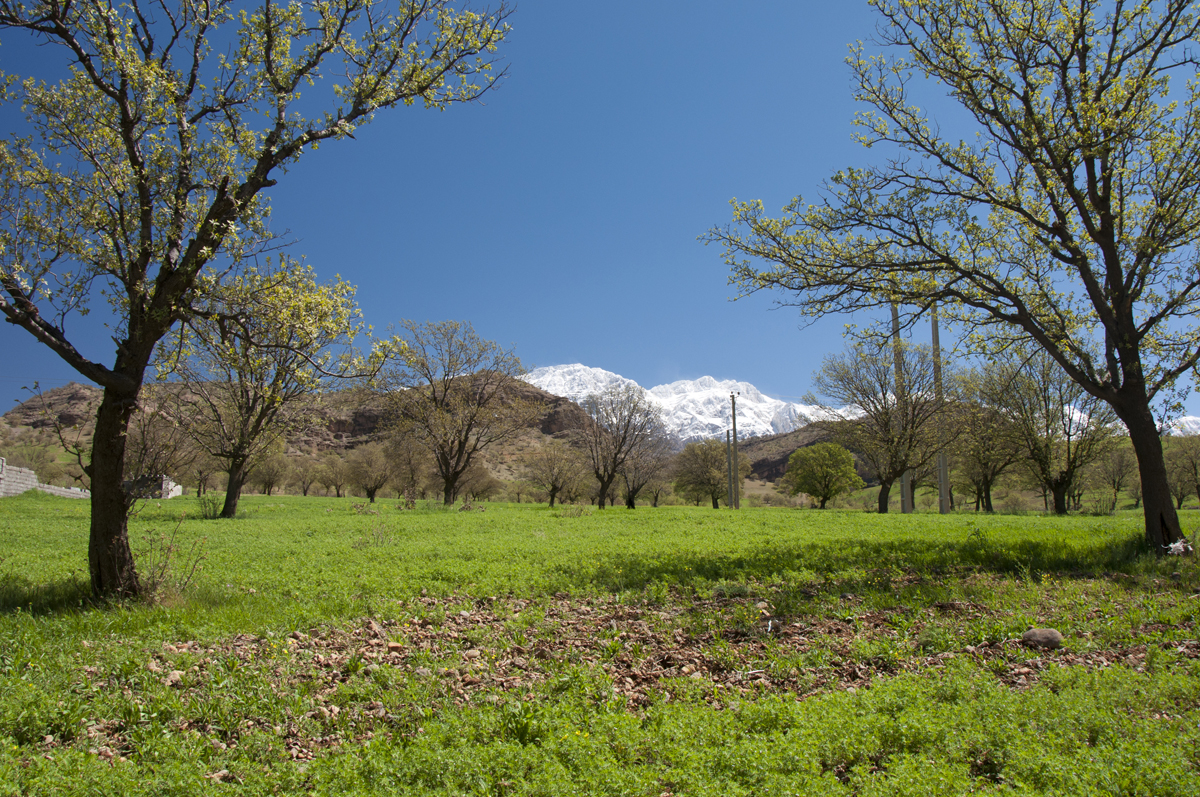
Dena, a biosphere reserve in Iran

The biosphere reserves of Iran have a total land area of 1.64 million km^{2}. The "reserves" support more than 8,000 recorded species of plants (almost 2,421 are endemic), 502 species of birds, 164 species of mammals, 209 species of reptiles, and 375 species of butterflies.

=== India ===
India's 18 biospheres extend over a total of 85,940 km^{2} (33,180 sq mi) and protect larger areas than typical national parks in other countries. The first national reserve of India was established in 1986.

=== Israel ===
Israel's national parks are declared historic sites or nature reserves, which are mostly operated and maintained by the National Nature and Parks Authority. As of 2019, Israel maintains more than 490 nature reserves that protect 2,500 species of indigenous wild plants, 20 species of fish, 530 species of birds and 70 species of mammals. In total, they cover 6,400 km^{2} (2,500 sq mi) of nature reserves, approximately 28% of the country's land area. In 1984, the two areas with the highest number of nature reserves were the South (15.2%) and Samaria (the Shomron, 13.5%).

=== Japan ===
Under the Nature Conservation Law, places can be designated as 'wilderness areas', 'nature conservation areas' and 'prefectural nature conservation areas'. In 1995, when the Japanese Government published its information in English, there were 5 wilderness areas, 10 nature conservation areas and 516 prefectural nature conservation areas.

=== Jordan ===
There are seven nature reserves in Jordan. In 1966 the organization that would later start Jordan's nature reserves, the Royal Society for the Conservation of Nature, was founded. RSCN's first efforts involved bringing back severely endangered species. In 1973, RSCN was given the right to issue hunting licenses, giving RSCN an upper hand in preventing extinction. The first step was the founding of Jordan's first nature reserve, Shaumari Wildlife Reserve, in 1975. The primary purpose was to create means to breed endangered species, specifically: the Arabian oryx, gazelles, ostriches, and Persian onagers in their natural environment.

=== Kyrgyzstan ===
By the end of 2009 there were 10 nature reserves (Kyrgyz: корук, koruk) in Kyrgyzstan covering 600,000 hectares (6,000 km^{2}) or about three percent of the total area of the country.

=== Mexico, Belize, and Guatemala ===
In 2025, these three countries developed a tri-national nature reserve, the Corredor Biocultural Gran Selva Maya, which is the second largest nature reserve in the Americas.

=== New Zealand ===
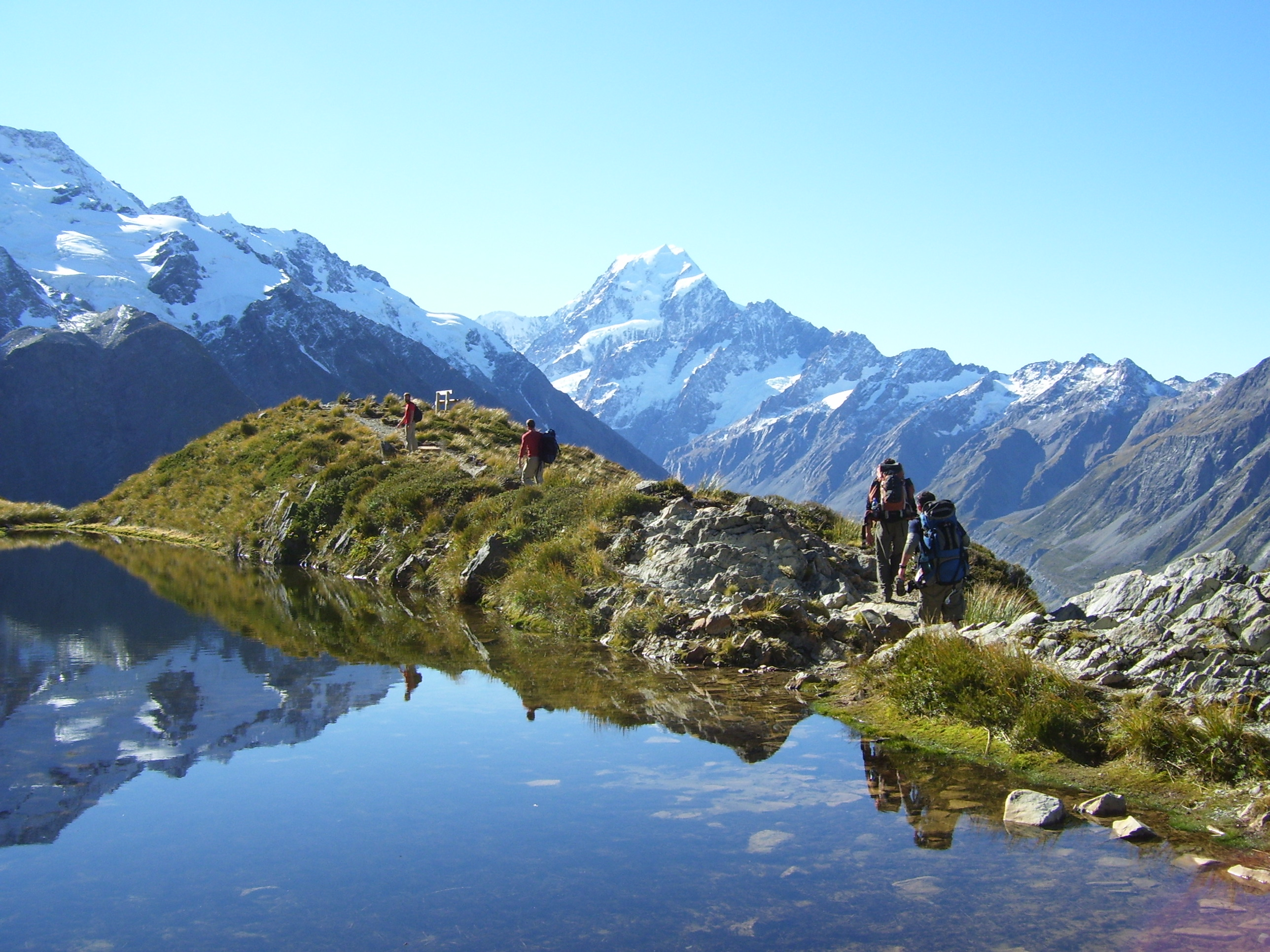
Aoraki / Mount Cook National Park in New Zealand

New Zealand has a variety of types of reserve, including national parks, various types of conservation areas (including stewardship land that is yet to be officially classified), and seven specific types of "reserve", each of which prioritize various degrees of protection to different amenities such as scenery, recreation, flora and fauna, scientific value, or history. Land is often sub-categorised beneath its general classification, as defined in law between the Reserves Act of 1977, the National Parks Act of 1980, and the Conservation Act of 1987. Under these classifications, the Department of Conservation administers more than 80,000 square kilometres (31,000 sq mi)—nearly 30% of the nation's total area—with at least some degree of protection. This land is composed of 14 National Parks, 30 Conservation Parks, and approximately 8,900 discrete areas of land in total.

Although the most public land is strongly protected for natural preservation, the term nature reserve is specifically defined in the Reserves Act to mean a reserve that prioritizes the protection of rare flora and fauna, to the extent that public access is by permit only. Some of these reserves include Ecological Islands, a comparatively new concept in wildlife preservation, pioneered in New Zealand to help rebuild the populations of nearly extinct birds, and other species that are heavily threatened by introduced predators.

=== Nicaragua ===
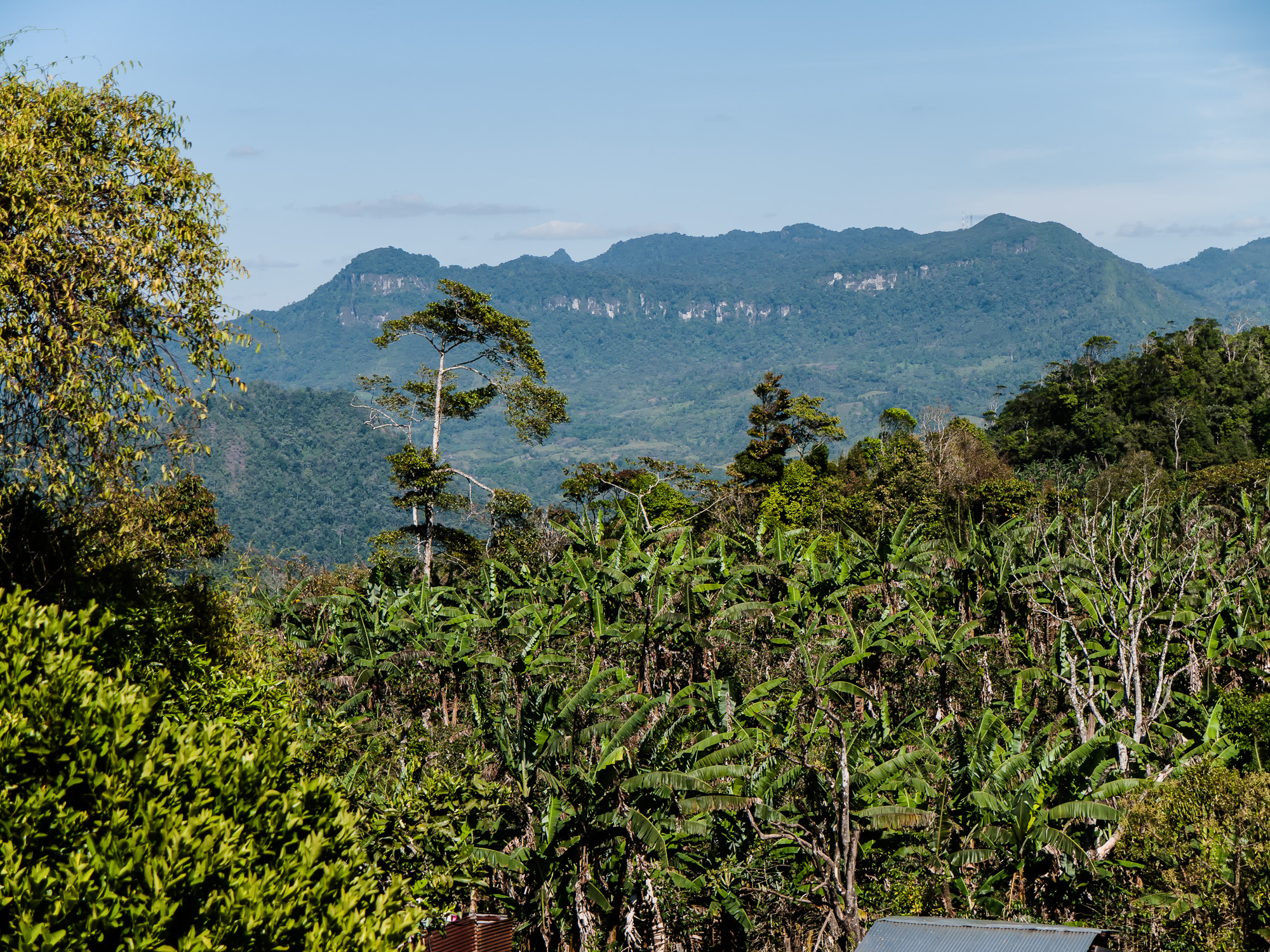
Peñas Blancas, part of the Bosawás Biosphere Reserve is the second largest rainforest in the Western Hemisphere, after the Amazonian Rainforest in Brazil. Located northeast of the city of Jinotega in Northeastern Nicaragua.

In Nicaragua, the Ministry of the Environment and Natural Resources (MARENA) is in charge of environmental protection and of the study, planning, and management of Nicaragua's natural resources. Nearly one-fifth of the territory is designated as protected areas like national parks, nature reserves (including the Bosawás Biosphere Reserve), and biological reserves. Nicaragua has 78 protected areas that cover 22,422 km^{2} (8,657 sq mi), about 17.3% of the nation's landmass. Private nature reserves exist with land excluded from private land trusts and maintained at the sole cost of the proprietor. For example, O Parks, WildLife, and Recreation, Or El Ostional Private Wildlife Reserve, was established within the Mesoamerican Biological Corridor by retired FDNY firefighter Kevin Michael Shea, who purchased 46 acres (0.19 km^{2}) of land for the purpose of restoring the ecological system of a dry tropical forest, ravaged during the Nicaraguan Revolution. The park provides a private nature reserve, wildlife corridor and verified carbon credits.

=== Russia ===
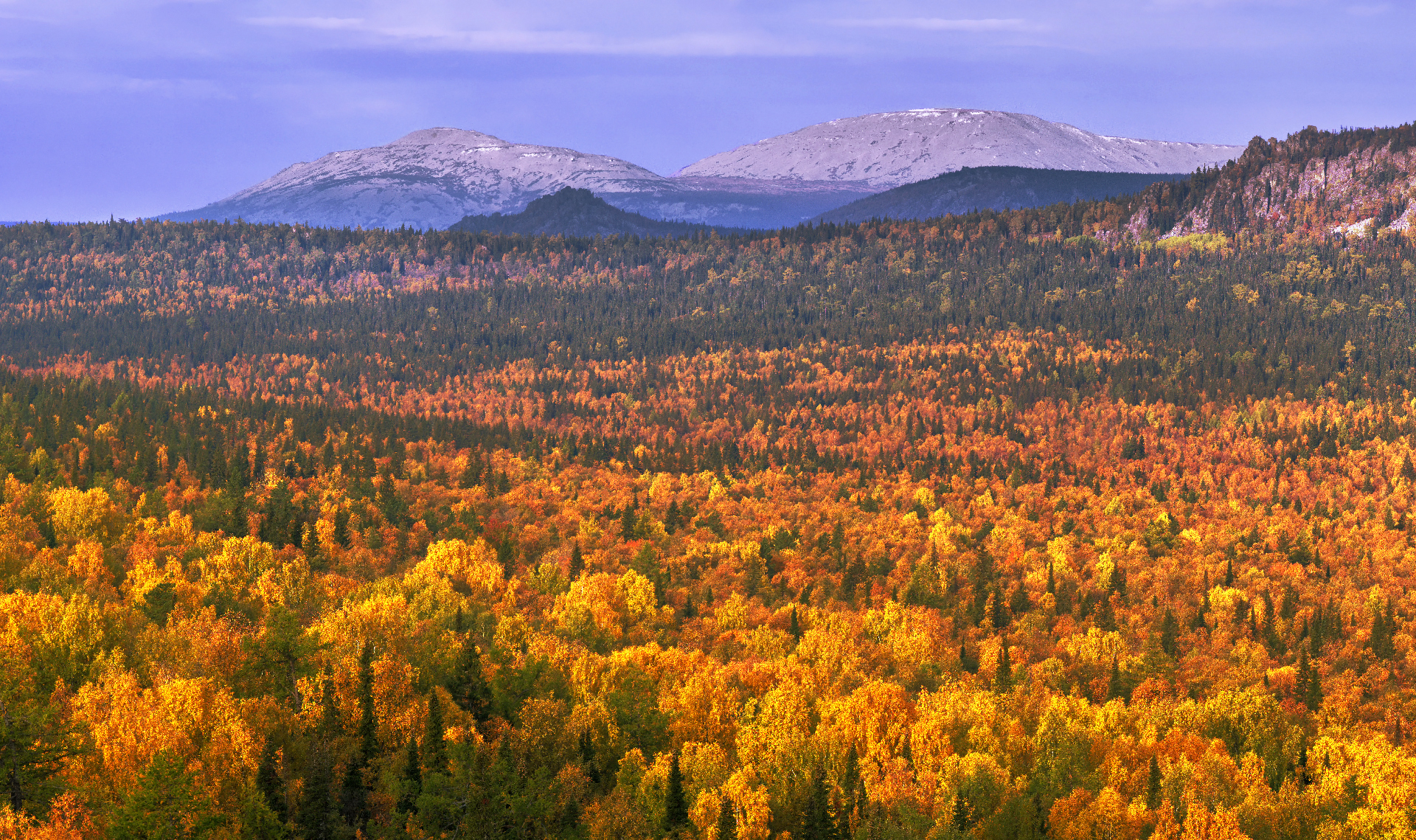
South Ural Nature Reserve in Russia

There are around 100 nature reserves (Russian: заповедник, romanized: zapovednik) in Russia, covering some 330,000 km^{2} (130,000 sq mi), or about 1.4% of the country's total area. A few of them predate the October Revolution of 1917, but most have been created during the Soviet Union era. There are also natural protected areas where only certain species are protected, or only certain activities are prohibited; those are known as zakaznik (Russian: заказник).

Unofficial sanctuaries can also occur as a result of human accidents; the Chernobyl Exclusion Zone has in practice become a wildlife refuge since very few people live in the area. Wildlife has flourished in the zone since the Chernobyl nuclear accident in 1986.

=== South Africa ===
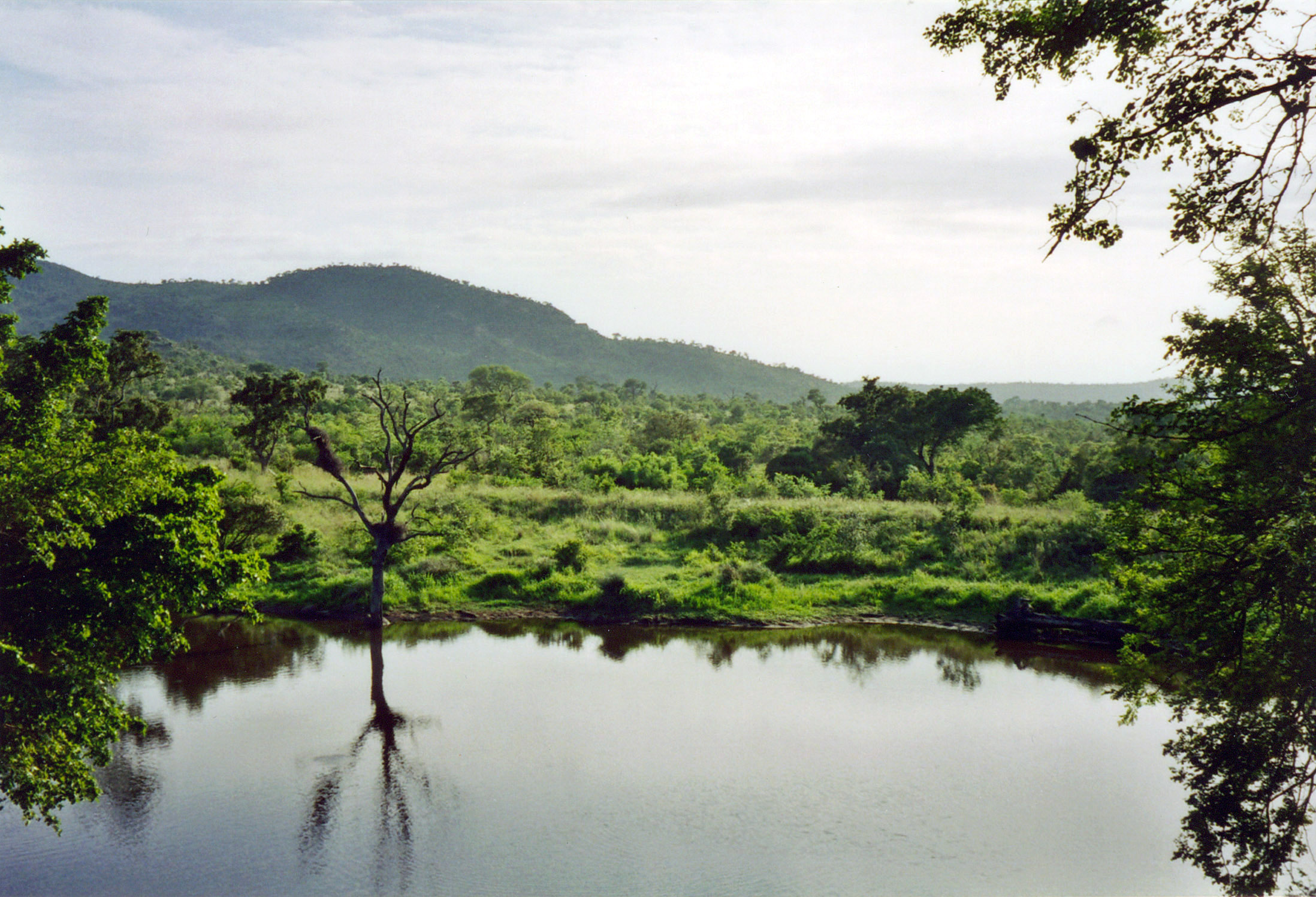
Matjulu waterhole near Berg-en-dal in the Kruger National Park

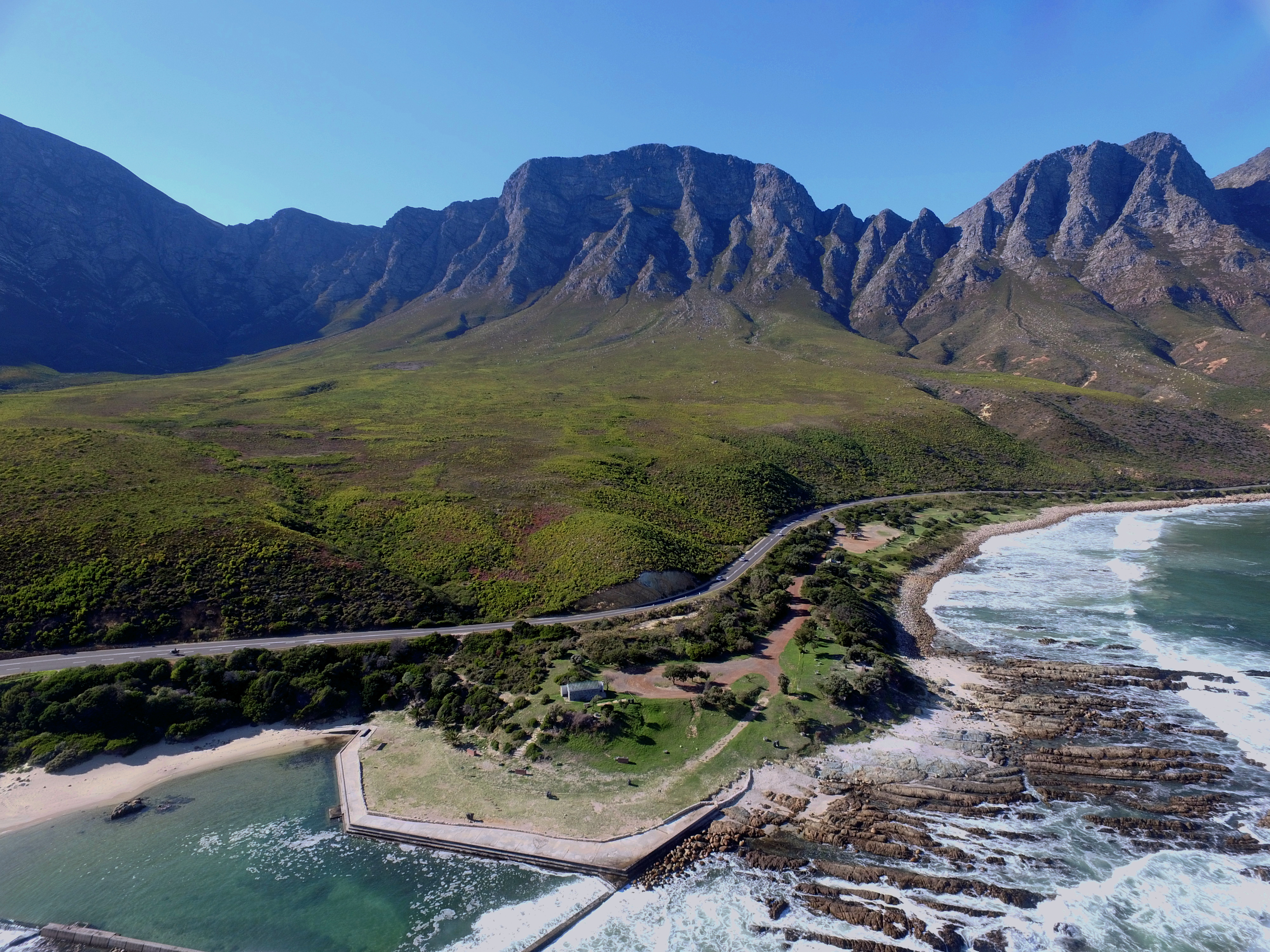
With ≈9000 plant species found in ≈78km², the Cape Floristic Region has a concentration of plants that is greater than anywhere else on earth.

South Africa is well known for its many nature reserves. The oldest nature reserve in the country (and oldest conservation area in the world) is the Groenkloof Nature Reserve that was established in 1892 in the capital city Pretoria in the old South African Republic and current Republic of South Africa.

The country has many national parks but the best-known is the Kruger National Park, which was announced in 1898, and is the largest, at nearly 2,000,000 ha (20,000 km^{2}). The Kruger Park and Table Mountain National Park are two of South Africa's most visited tourist attractions, along with the Addo Elephant National Park.

South Africa also has 10 World Heritage Sites, including four natural sites and one mixed site. And it has provincial game reserves including Shamwari, Londolozi, Sanbona and Lalibela. The country currently has 20 national parks covering 3,700,000 ha (37,000 km^{2}), about 3% of the total area of South Africa.

The Prince Edward Islands, which are South African territories in the Southern Ocean, have been declared a special nature reserve. It is a highly protected area from which all human activity is excluded, except for conservation and scientific research.

=== Sri Lanka ===
The area around Mihintale, Sri Lanka, was a sanctuary for wildlife, probably the first of its generation in the ancient world. According to stone inscriptions found in the vicinity, the king commanded the people not to harm animals or destroy trees within the area.

=== United States ===
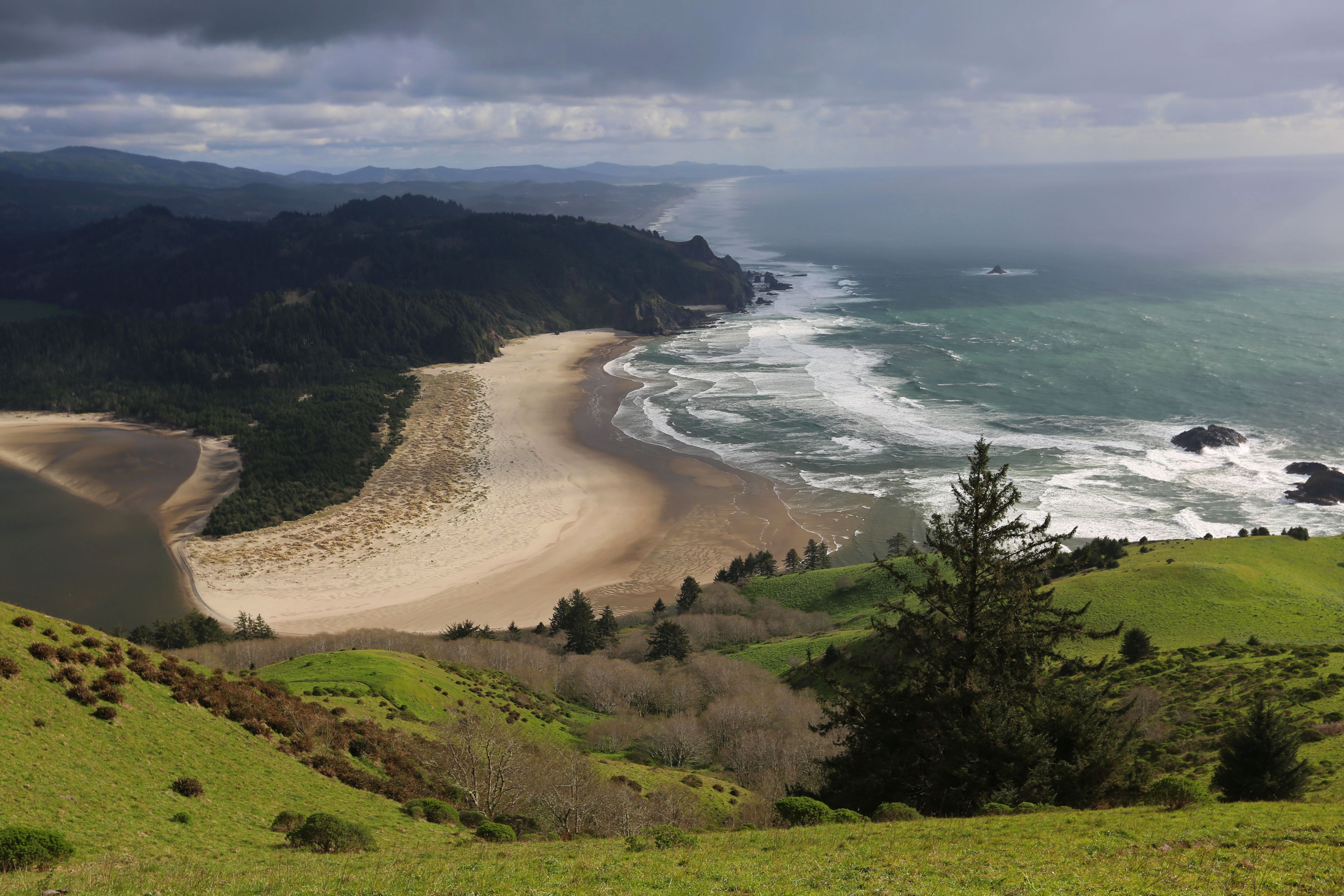
Cascade Head, Oregon, United States, is a UNESCO biosphere reserve.

In the United States, the U.S. Fish and Wildlife Service, managed by the Secretary of the Interior, is responsible for managing many of the federal nature reserves including the National Wildlife Refuge System. The National Wildlife Refuge System includes areas administered for the protection and conservation of fish and wildlife that are threatened with extinction, as well as wildlife ranges, game ranges, wildlife management areas, and waterfowl production areas.

The first North American wildlife refuge, Lake Merritt Wildlife sanctuary at Lake Merritt, was established by Samuel Merritt and enacted in California state law in 1870 as the first government owned refuge. The first federally owned refuge in the United States is Pelican Island National Wildlife Refuge and was established by Theodore Roosevelt in 1903 as part of his Square Deal campaign to improve the country. At the time, setting aside land for wildlife was not a constitutional right of the president. In 2006, a bi-partisan group of US House of Representatives members established the Congressional Wildlife Refuge Caucus to further support the needs of the National Wildlife Refuge System in Congress.

There are also state-level administered State Nature Reserves found throughout the country, as well as smaller reserves operated by local governments, private trusts, or even funded through public donations. Private nature reserves also exist, with land excluded from private land trusts and maintained at the sole cost of the proprietor, such as the 1,800 acres (730 ha) Wilbur Hot Springs and the Unexpected Nature Reserve set up by Hope Sawyer Buyukmihci.

== See also ==
- Forest of Fontainebleau – Forest in France
- Half-Earth – 2016 book by E.O. Wilson, a proposal to increase global coverage
- List of types of formally designated forests
- National Wildlife Refuge Association – US non-profit organization
- Nature park – Protected land area
- Protection forest – Forest that protects from natural hazard
- Refuge (ecology) – Place where an organism is protected from predation
- Wildlife corridor – Connecting wild territories for animals
- Zoo – Collection of wild animals
