= Half-Earth =

2016 book by E.O. Wilson

- Cover of the first edition
- Author: E. O. Wilson
- Subject: Biodiversity
- Publisher: Liveright
- Publication date: 2016
- Media type: Print (Hardcover and Paperback)
- Pages: 272 (paperback)
- ISBN: 978-1-63149-252-5
- Preceded by: The Meaning of Human Existence (2014)

Half-Earth: Our Planet's Fight for Life is a 2016 book by the biologist E. O. Wilson, the last in a trilogy beginning with The Social Conquest of Earth (2012) and The Meaning of Human Existence (2014). Half-Earth proposes that half of the Earth's surface should be designated a human-free natural reserve to preserve biodiversity. Wilson noted that the term "Half-Earth" was coined for this concept by Tony Hiss in his Smithsonian article "Can the World Really Set Aside Half the Planet for Wildlife?"

== Reception ==
Ecologist Christine Griffiths, reviewing the book in Science, described Wilson's plan as an "evidence rich plea dismissing Anthropocene optimism that humanity could survive without nature". However Griffiths questioned whether Wilson's demand was realistic, as in 2015 only 15% of land and 2.8% of marine areas were protected. She lauded Wilson to challenge the reader to take individual responsibility to preserve the biosphere.

Dean Kuipers from Outside magazine wrote "Half-Earth is less detailed plan than aspirational goal". Kuipers asked about logistics: "Would people in preservation areas be relocated, or would they be allowed to stay? Would governments agree to such protections?" He pointed out that Wilson spends a portion of the book criticizing "new conservationists", individuals who believe in smart economic development, but that in "the second to last chapter of Half-Earth, Wilson makes the case for smart and fast development".

The Guardian found Wilson did "a first-class job at providing an outline of our terrible ecological plight", an "antidote to the views of those that everything is tickety-boo in the Garden of Eden", but he criticized that "providing no detail of the measures needed to ensure his goal or what territories should be annexed or what funding mechanisms or agreements will be required to achieve his goal...is a pretty serious limitation".

Jedediah Purdy reviewed the book in The New Republic April 2016 at length in careful, contextual detail of Wilson's prior findings, views and experience, unlike other reviewers. He identified the "strengths and limitations of [Wilson's] standpoint are those of a mind formed in the twentieth-century United States...assuming nature is generally benign and is at its purest in wilderness". He criticized Wilson's "indifference to serious political thought" calling him revivalist, post-Transcendentalist, the book "of grand ambition without much to say... poorly balanced", for example when Wilson mentions artificial intelligence at the end or when Wilson devotes polemical chapters to the word Anthropocene. Purdy judged, the book is a "victim of Wilson's parochial understanding of the human beings who are both its audience and its topic".

Kirkus Reviews called Wilson "unquestionably well-versed in the nature of the problem, ...[but] fuzzy on the solution", and "Not so much a potent plan as another informed plea for humanity to act as stewards".

In November 2017, Richard Horton mentioned Half-Earth in The Lancet pointing out that Wilson argues for "investment to understand better the ecosystems on which we rely".

In 2015, Audubon magazine wrote that "in many ways this respected scholar is risking his reputation of a lifetime with such a radical idea. But then, frankly, he doesn’t think he is the radical. He’s shocked at how inured we’ve all become to habitat destruction."

The Library Journal's Barbara Hoffert selected Half-Earth as one of her top five non-fiction books of March 2015, without a critical review, however.

== See also ==
- 30 by 30 – International ecological preservation initiative
- EcoHealth – Study of human health and ecosystems
- Planetary health – Health of civilization and natural systems
