= 30 by 30 =

International ecological preservation initiative

Percentage of land in protected areas by country

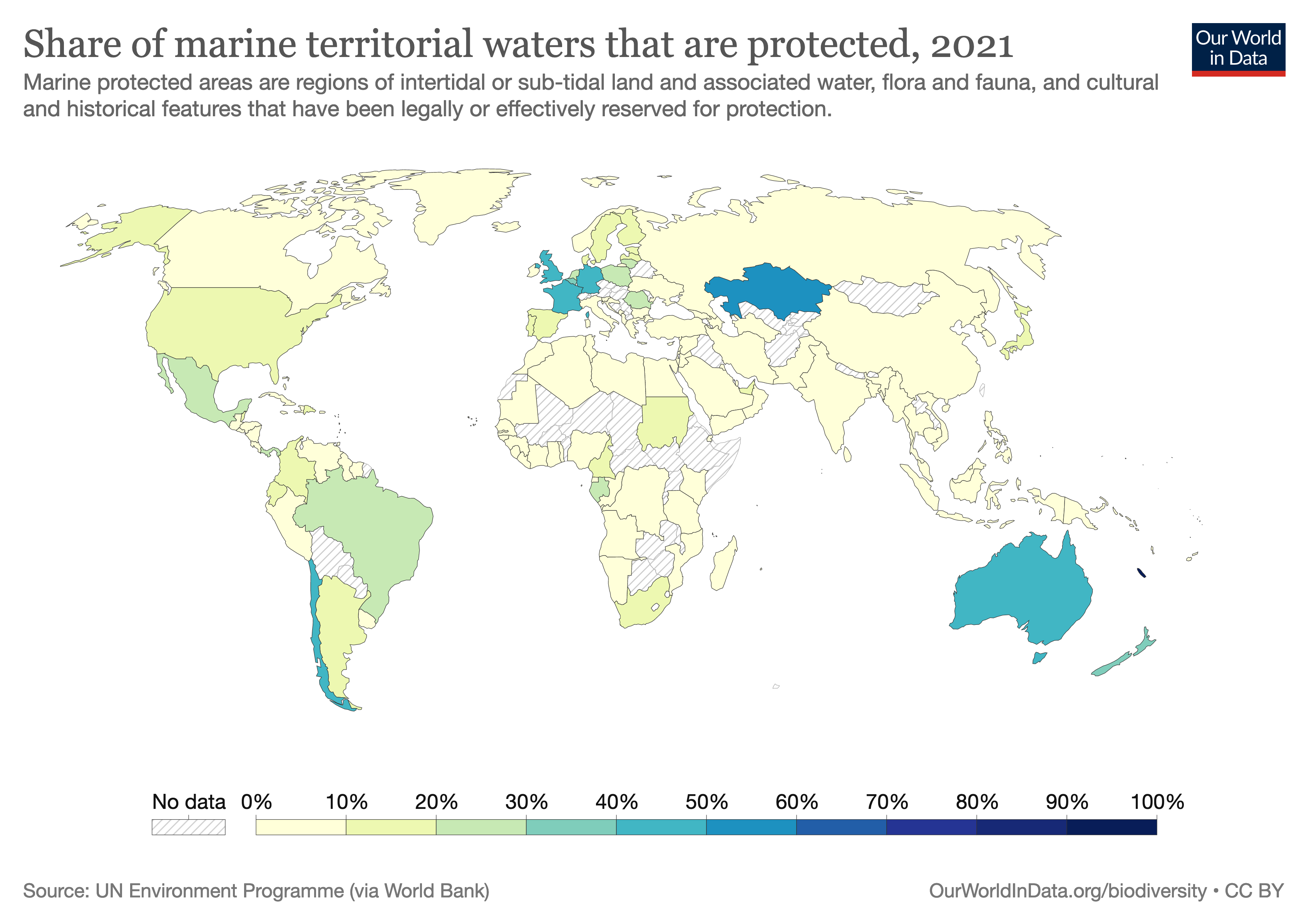
Percentage of ocean area that is protected by country

30 by 30 (or 30 × 30) is a global initiative for governments to designate 30% of Earth's land and ocean area as protected areas by 2030. The target was proposed by a 2019 article in Science Advances, "A Global Deal for Nature: Guiding principles, milestones, and targets", highlighting the need for expanded nature conservation efforts to mitigate climate change. Launched by the High Ambition Coalition in 2020, more than 50 nations had agreed to the initiative by January 2021, which had increased to more than 100 countries by October 2022.

US$5 billion in funding for a project called the "Protecting Our Planet Challenge" was announced for the initiative in September 2021.

In December 2022, 30 by 30 was agreed at the COP15 meeting of the Convention on Biological Diversity, and became a target of the Kunming-Montreal Global Biodiversity Framework. This includes the G7 and European Union.

The initiative has attracted controversy over indigenous rights issues.

As of May 2026, 17.3% of terrestrial land and inland waters and 9.8% of marine areas are protected. Including OECM's (Other Effective Area-based Conservation Measures) the percent of protected areas are 18.4% of terrestrial and inland waters and 10.0% of marine areas.

== Global ==
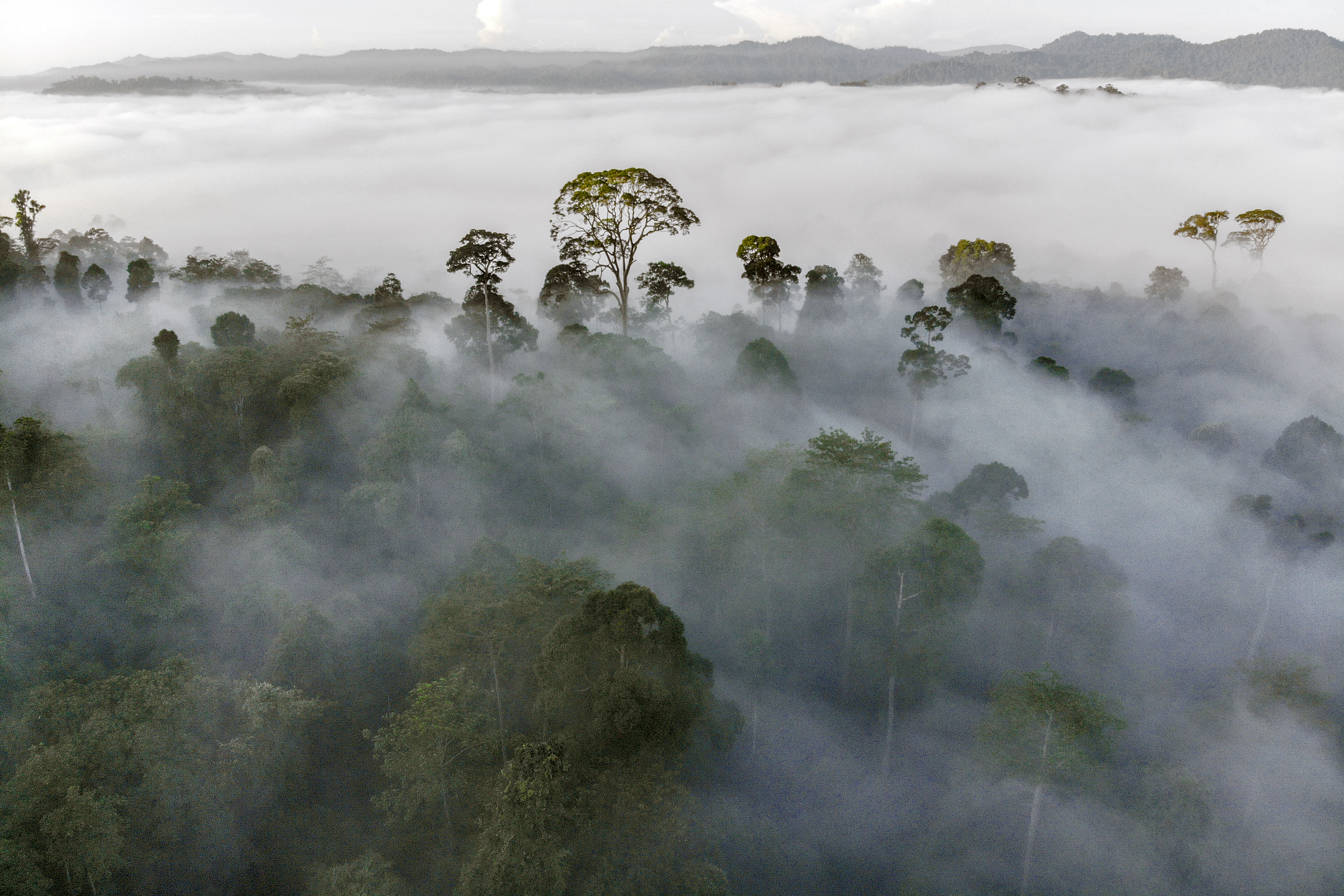
Danum Valley Conservation Area in Malaysia, one of the over 295,000 terrestrial protected areas included in the 30x30 initiative.

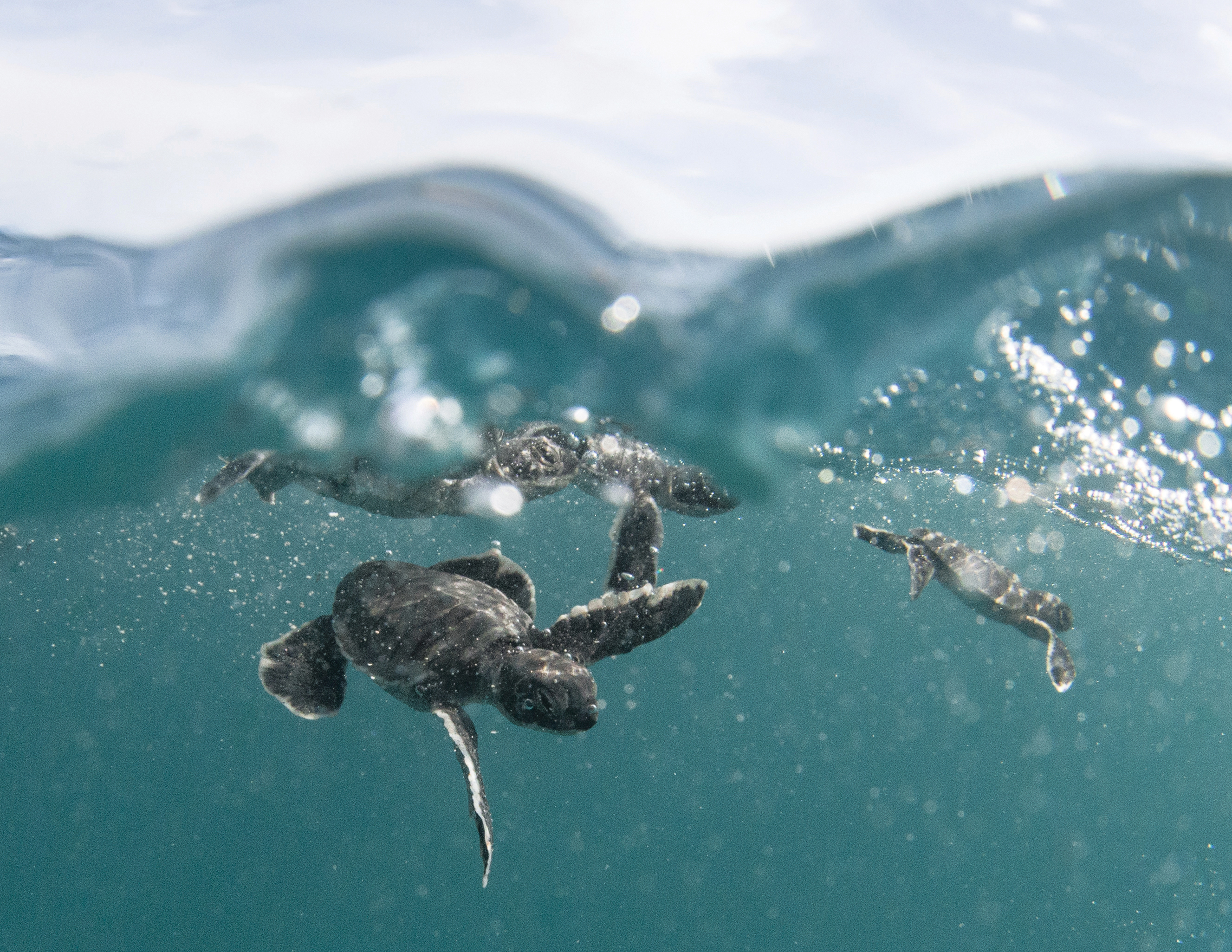
Baby green sea turtles in Papahānaumokuākea Marine National Monument in Hawaii, one of the over 16,000 marine protected areas included in the 30x30 initiative.

30 by 30 is the third of 23 global biodiversity targets for 2030 in the Kunming-Montreal Global Biodiversity Framework, adopted in December 2022:

Ensure and enable that by 2030 at least 30 per cent of terrestrial, inland water, and of coastal and marine areas, especially areas of particular importance for biodiversity and ecosystem functions and services, are effectively conserved and managed through ecologically representative, well-connected and equitably governed systems of protected areas and other effective area-based conservation measures, recognizing indigenous and traditional territories, where applicable, and integrated into wider landscapes, seascapes and the ocean, while ensuring that any sustainable use, where appropriate in such areas, is fully consistent with conservation outcomes, recognizing and respecting the rights of indigenous peoples and local communities, including over their traditional territories.

== European Union ==
The European Commission's Biodiversity strategy for 2030 was proposed on May 20, 2020, as the European Union's contribution to a post-2020 global biodiversity framework. The strategy contains several biodiversity-related commitments and actions to be delivered by 2030, including:

- increasing the European Union's network of terrestrial and marine protected areas, by expanding Natura 2000 areas, and providing strict protection of areas with very high biodiversity and climate value.
- restore more degraded ecosystems and manage them sustainably, by proposing binding nature restoration targets.
- strengthening governance of European Union biodiversity efforts, including expanded funding, improving implementation and tracking, and integrating biodiversity goals into public and business decision-making.

The plan includes turning 30% of EU territory to protected area by 2030 and 10% to strictly protected area. However as of 2023 EU is not on track to meet the targets.

The biodiversity strategy is a core part of the European Green Deal, and also intended to support green recovery from the COVID-19 pandemic.

In July 2023 after many debates the European parliament adopted a version of the Nature restoration law, aiming to restore nature on 20% of the territory of the European Union by 2030.

In 2024, the European Union passed a nature restoration law aiming to restore 20% of degraded ecosystems by 2030 and 100% by 2050.

== United States ==
On January 27, 2021, President Joe Biden issued an executive order on "Tackling the Climate Crisis at Home and Abroad". Among several initiatives to address the climate crisis, the order directed federal departments to issue a report within 90 days "recommending steps that the United States should take, working with State, local, Tribal, and territorial governments, agricultural and forest landowners, fishermen, and other key stakeholders, to achieve the goal of conserving at least 30 percent of our lands and waters by 2030."

On 6 May 2022, the Biden administration issued Conserving and Restoring America the Beautiful, a preliminary report to the National Climate Task Force outlining the proposed principles, measures, and early focus areas for a national "ten-year, locally-led campaign to conserve and restore the lands and waters upon which we all depend". Participating federal agencies included the U.S. Department of Interior, U.S. Department of Agriculture, U.S. Department of Commerce, and Council on Environmental Quality.

The report identified eight principles to guide the effort:

- Pursue a Collaborative and Inclusive Approach to Conservation
- Conserve America's Lands and Waters for the Benefit of All People
- Support Locally Led and Locally Designed Conservation Efforts
- Honor Tribal Sovereignty and Support the Priorities of Tribal Nations
- Pursue Conservation and Restoration Approaches that Create Jobs and Support Healthy Communities
- Honor Private Property Rights and Support the Voluntary Stewardship Efforts of Private Landowners and Fishers
- Use Science as a Guide
- Build on Existing Tools and Strategies with an Emphasis on Flexibility and Adaptive Approaches

The report outlined six early focus initiatives:

- Create more parks and safe outdoor opportunities in nature-deprived communities
- Support Tribally led conservation and restoration priorities
- Expand collaborative conservation of fish and wildlife habitats and corridors
- Increase access for outdoor recreation
- Incentivize and reward the voluntary conservation efforts of fishers, ranchers, farmers, and forest owners
- Create jobs by investing in restoration and resilience

The report proposed tracking progress through an American Conservation and Stewardship Atlas, an accessible online database and mapping tool which would provide current information on lands and waters conserved and restored, and an annual America the Beautiful public report, which would track fish and wildlife populations, and progress on conservation and restoration efforts across the country.

=== California ===
On 7 October 2020, California governor Gavin Newsom issued an executive order declaring it "the goal of the State to conserve at least 30 percent of California's land and coastal waters by 2030", and directing state agencies to develop and report strategies for achieving the goal by February 1, 2022. The order also established a California Biodiversity Collaborative composed of representatives of government agencies, Native tribes, experts, and other stakeholders.

The official report, Pathways to 30x30 California, was issued by the California Natural Resources Agency on 22 April 2022. The report outlines ten pathways, or strategies, to achieving California's biodiversity and protected area goals by 2030:

1. Accelerate Regionally Led Conservation
2. Execute Strategic Land Acquisitions
3. Increase Voluntary Conservation Easements
4. Enhance Conservation of Existing Public Lands and Coastal Waters
5. Institutionalize Advance Mitigation
6. Expand and Accelerate Environmental Restoration and Stewardship
7. Strengthen Coordination Among Governments
8. Align Investments to Maximize Conservation Benefits
9. Advance and Promote Complementary Conservation Measures
10. Evaluate Conservation Outcomes and Adaptively Manage

== Implementation and effectiveness ==
Implementation of the 30 by 30 target has progressed unevenly, and researchers caution that simply increasing the extent of protected areas is not sufficient to halt biodiversity loss. Some conservationists argue that the 30% figure lacks a clear scientific justification and risks being treated as a symbolic or political benchmark rather than a threshold grounded in ecological evidence. A 2019 article in the Science journal argues, for instance, that post‑2020 protected area targets should be evaluated against measurable biodiversity outcomes, cautioning that percentage‑based goals divorced from species and ecosystem data may not reliably translate into conservation gains, while a review published in the journal PARKS similarly concludes that percentage‑area targets cannot be separated from considerations of protection quality if they are to deliver meaningful conservation outcomes. At the same time, other researchers and advocacy groups contend that 30% may in fact be too low to secure long‑term ecological integrity, and point to proposals such as the "Half‑Earth" concept, which calls for roughly 50% of terrestrial and marine realms to be conserved in some form. These debates have contributed to calls for implementation strategies that prioritise ecologically important, well‑connected and socially legitimate sites, and that tie percentage‑area targets to measurable biodiversity outcomes and protection quality if they are to deliver meaningful conservation gains.

A further concern relates to the quality and effectiveness of protection once areas are designated. Researchers and NGOs have highlighted the persistence of so‑called "paper parks": protected areas that exist in law but lack adequate funding, staffing or enforcement, allowing activities such as poaching, illegal logging, or unregulated development to continue. Modelling work by Kuempel et al. suggests that, for exploited species, improving enforcement and management within existing protected areas can in many cases deliver greater conservation benefits than simply expanding the network’s total area without a corresponding increase in resources. A later study by Timms and Holden develops an optimisation framework for deciding how to allocate limited budgets between expanding protected areas and strengthening enforcement, and finds that where threats such as over‑harvesting are intense, investments in compliance and on‑the‑ground management can be more effective than creating new, weakly managed reserves. Taken together, this literature underlines that meeting percentage‑based targets without adequate governance capacity risks diluting scarce conservation resources.

Other research has examined conditions under which expanding protected areas can still be beneficial even when management budgets do not increase. In a 2025 Biological Conservation article, researchers propose a framework for deciding whether to expand or better manage protected areas when threats are concentrated near reserve edges, and show that enlarging protected areas can reduce extinction risk by creating larger core zones that are difficult for extractive users to access. Their results suggest that, in landscapes where human pressures are spatially clumped near reserve boundaries, strategically increasing the size of protected areas can create more secure habitat refuges even without proportional increases in staffing or enforcement. This work complements studies emphasising management quality by indicating that decisions about whether to expand or intensify protection should be tailored to local threat patterns, ecological characteristics and governance constraints, rather than driven solely by the desire to reach a headline figure such as 30%.

In practice, the 30 by 30 commitment has also prompted debate over how "protected" or "conserved" areas are defined for monitoring and reporting purposes. Some governments and organisations favour relatively broad interpretations that include a wide range of "other effective area‑based conservation measures" (OECMs), such as certain working forests, sustainably managed fisheries or multi‑use lands with partial restrictions, while others advocate stricter criteria that reserve protected status for areas managed primarily for biodiversity conservation. Environmental groups and some researchers have warned that overly expansive definitions risk inflating reported progress if they allow extensive areas with ongoing intensive industrial activity to count toward the target, while contributing relatively little to species persistence or ecosystem integrity. These discussions highlight a recurring theme in the literature: that the effectiveness of 30 by 30 will depend not only on reaching a numerical area goal, but also on the ecological representativeness, governance arrangements and on‑the‑ground management of the places designated as protected or conserved.

Implementation of the 30 by 30 target has also raised concerns about “green grabbing” and green colonialism in the way new protected and conserved areas may be established. On 30 November 2022, a group of NGOs including Amnesty International, Minority Rights Group International and Rainforest Foundation UK published an open letter warning that, without strong human-rights safeguards and the full participation of affected communities, efforts to meet the 30 by 30 goal could lead to forced evictions, loss of livelihoods and other abuses against Indigenous peoples and local communities. Similar critiques have been echoed by human rights organisations and researchers who argue that percentage-based conservation targets can replicate earlier "fortress conservation" models if they are implemented through top-down land designations that disregard customary tenure and existing uses.

More broadly, some Indigenous organisations have criticised the way 30 by 30 has been promoted and negotiated, arguing that it risks appropriating Indigenous lands under the guise of biodiversity conservation. The Union of British Columbia Indian Chiefs described aspects of the initiative as having "all the hallmarks of green colonialism", citing the marginalisation of Indigenous titles and rights in international conservation processes and warning that expanding protected areas without secure recognition of Indigenous jurisdiction could further entrench colonial patterns of land control.

Academic and policy analyses have similarly highlighted tensions between top‑down conservation targets and Indigenous self‑determination, and have called for implementation of 30 by 30 to prioritise Indigenous-led conservation, legal recognition of customary territories and rights-based safeguards if it is to avoid reproducing earlier patterns of exclusionary conservation.

== International Reactions ==
The COP15 included 196 parties in negotiations, with competing views regarding the adoption of the 30 by 30 target being wide-spread and well documented. The resulting agreement of the conference, the Convention on Biological Diversity, was signed by every party, with the exception of two: the United States and the Vatican. Towards the end of the talks, a negotiator from Democratic Republic of the Congo raised objections to the agreement, citing a lack of funding separate from the current Global Environment Facility (GEF). After a delay, COP15 president and Chinese environment minister Huang Runqiu overruled the objection due to a legal technicality, resulting in the passage of the agreement. Delegates from the DRC, Cameroon, and Uganda were reportedly displeased with the outcome. After the agreement was passed, the DRC's government announced that it would not recognize it as valid.

== See also ==
- Half-Earth
- Kunming-Montreal Global Biodiversity Framework
- Rewilding
