= National Wildlife Refuge =

United States protected area designation

National Wildlife Refuge System
- IUCN category IV (habitat/species management area)
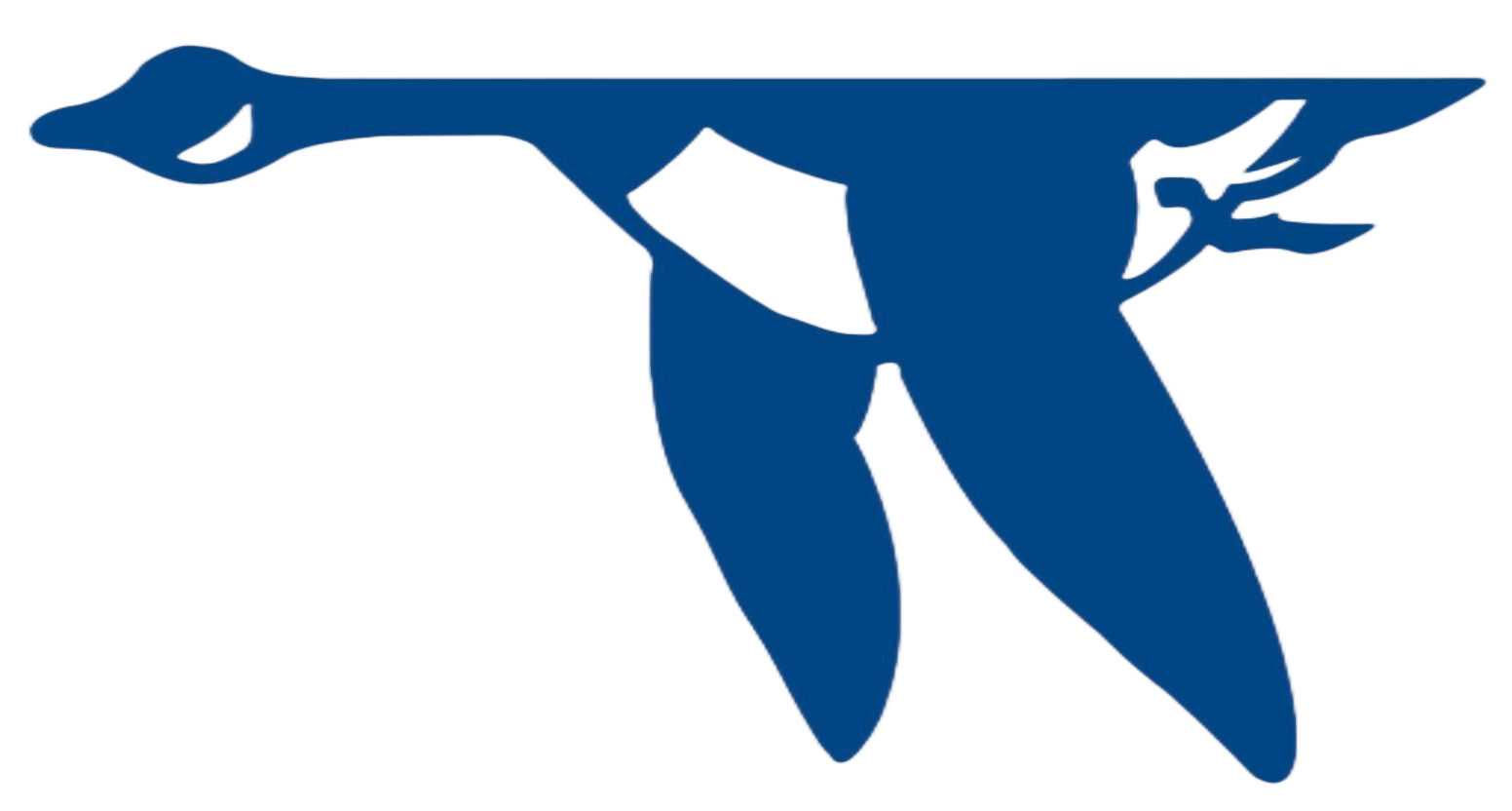
- Location: United States
- Area: 859 million acres
- Established: March 14, 1903; 123 years ago
- Visitors: 65 million (in FY 2022)
- Governing body: U.S. Fish and Wildlife Service

The National Wildlife Refuge System is a system of protected areas of the United States managed by the United States Fish and Wildlife Service, an agency within the Department of the Interior. The National Wildlife Refuge System is the system of public lands and waters set aside to conserve America's fish, wildlife, and plants.

== Background ==
The mission of the refuge system is: "To administer a national network of lands and waters for the conservation, management, and where appropriate, restoration of fish, wildlife, and plant resources and their habitats within the United States for the benefit of the present and future generations of Americans". The system maintains the biological integrity, diversity, and environmental health of these natural resources and enables for associated public enjoyment of these areas where compatible with conservation efforts.

National Wildlife Refuges manage a range of habitat types, including wetlands, prairies, coastal and marine areas, and temperate, tundra, and boreal forests. The management of each habitat is a complex process of controlling or eradicating invasive species, using fire in a prescribed manner, assuring adequate water resources, and assessing external threats such as development or contamination.

Hundreds of national refuges are home to some 700 species of birds, 220 species of mammals, 250 reptile and amphibian species, and more than 1000 species of fish. Endangered species are a priority of National Wildlife Refuges, with nearly 60 refuges having the primary purpose of conserving in aggregate 280 threatened or endangered species.

The National Wildlife Refuge System welcomes about 65 million visitors each year to participate in outdoor recreational activities. The system manages six wildlife-dependent recreational uses, including hunting, fishing, birding, photography, environmental education, and environmental interpretation. Hunters visit more than 350 hunting programs on refuges and on about 36,000 waterfowl production areas. Opportunities for fresh or saltwater fishing are available at more than 340 refuges. Each state contains at least one refuge.

National Wildlife Refuge System employees are responsible for planning, biological monitoring and habitat conservation, contaminants management, visitor services, outreach and environmental education, heavy equipment operation, law enforcement, and fire management.

The National Wildlife Refuge System deals with urban intrusion/development, habitat fragmentation, degradation of water quantity and quality, climate change, invasive species, increasing demands for recreation, and increasing demands for energy development. The system has provided a habitat for endangered species, migratory birds, plants, and numerous other valuable animals, implemented the NWRS Improvement Act, acquired and protected key critical inholdings, and established leadership in habitat restoration and management.

Under the act, the NWRS has created Comprehensive Conservation Plans (CCPs) for each refuge, developed through consultation with private and public stakeholders. These began a review process by stakeholders beginning in 2013. The CCPs must be consistent with the FWS goals for conservation and wildlife management.

The CCPs outline conservation goals for each refuge for 15 years into the future, with the intent that they will be revised every 15 years thereafter. The comprehensive conservation planning process requires a scoping phase, in which each refuge holds public meetings to identify the public's main concerns; plan formulation, when refuge staff and FWS planners identify the key issues and refuge goals; writing the draft plan, in which wildlife and habitat alternatives are developed, and the plan is submitted for public review; revision of the draft plan, which takes into consideration the public's input; and plan implementation.

Each CCP is required to comply with the National Environmental Policy Act (NEPA) and must consider potential alternatives for habitat and wildlife management on the refuge, and identify their possible effects on the refuge. The NEPA requires FWS planners and refuge staff to engage the public in this planning process to assist them with identifying the most appropriate alternative.

Completed CCPs are available to the public and can be found on the FWS website.

== History ==
Since President Theodore Roosevelt designated Florida's Pelican Island National Wildlife Refuge as the first wildlife refuge in 1903, the system has grown to over 568 national wildlife refuges and 38 wetland management districts encompassing about 859,000,000 acres (3,476,200 km^{2}). For more information see the History and Future of our National Wildlife Refuge System compiled by the National Wildlife Refuge Association.

== Management activities ==
Comprehensive wildlife and habitat management demands the integration of scientific information from several disciplines, including understanding ecological processes and monitoring status of fish, wildlife and plants. Equally important is an intimate understanding of the social and economic drivers that impact and are affected by management decisions and can facilitate or impede implementation success. Service strategic habitat conservation planning, design, and delivery efforts are affected by the demographic, societal, and cultural changes of population growth and urbanization, as well as people's attitudes and values toward wildlife. Consideration of these factors contributes to the success of the service's mission to protect wildlife and their habitats.

The refuge system works collaboratively internally and externally to leverage resources and achieve effective conservation. It works with other federal agencies, state fish and wildlife agencies, tribes, nongovernmental organizations, local landowners, community volunteers, and other partners. Meaningful engagement with stakeholders at a regional, integrated level adds to the effective conservation achievements of the FWS and allows individual refuges to respond more effectively to challenges.

Wildlife and habitat management activities include:

1. Monitoring plant and animal populations
2. Restoring wetland, forest, grassland, and marine habitats
3. Controlling the spread of invasive species
4. Reintroducing rare fish, wildlife and plants to formerly occupied habitats
5. Monitoring air quality
6. Investigating and cleaning contaminants
7. Preventing and controlling wildlife disease outbreaks
8. Assessing water quality and quantity
9. Understanding the complex relationship between people and wildlife through the integration of social science
10. Managing habitats through manipulation of water levels, prescribed burning, haying, grazing,timber harvest, and planting vegetation

During fiscal year 2015, the refuge system manipulated 3.1 million acres of habitat (technique #10 from the preceding list) and managed 147 million acres of the system without habitat manipulation (using techniques #1 through 9 from the preceding list).

- Uplands managed: 1.9 million acres
- Wetlands managed: 1.0 million acres
- Open water managed: 0.2 million acres
- Treated by prescribed burning: 0.3 million acres
- Treated to control invasive plants: 0.2 million acres
- Protected but not manipulated: 147 million acres

Refuges attract about 65 million visitors each year who come to hunt, fish, observe, and photograph wildlife, and are a significant boon to local economies. According to the FWS's 2013 Banking on Nature Report, visitors to refuges positively impact the local economies. The report details that 47 million people who visited refuges that year:

- Generated $2.4 billion of sales in regional economies
- Supported over 35,000 jobs
- Generated $342.9 million in tax revenues at the local, county, state, and federal levels
- Contributed a total of $4.5 billion to the nation's economy

=== Visitation ===
- Wildlife observation visits in FY 2021: 41.7 million
- Nature photography visits in FY 2021: 15.1 million
- Fishing visits in FY 2021: 8.0 million
- Interpretive program visits in FY 2021: 2.5 million
- Hunting visits in FY 2021: 2.5 million
- Environmental education visits in FY 2021: 0.4 million
- Other visits in FY 2021: 10.9 million
- Total visits in FY 2021: 65 million

=== Volunteers ===
- Total volunteers in FY 2014: 36,000
- Total volunteer hours in FY 2014: 1.4 million

=== Personnel ===
- Total staff: 2,424 full-time equivalents (FY 2022 total)
- Number of Federal Wildlife Officers: 214 (source: FY 2024 Budget Justification)
- Number of firefighters: 460 (360 permanent and 100 temporary staff)

== Law enforcement ==
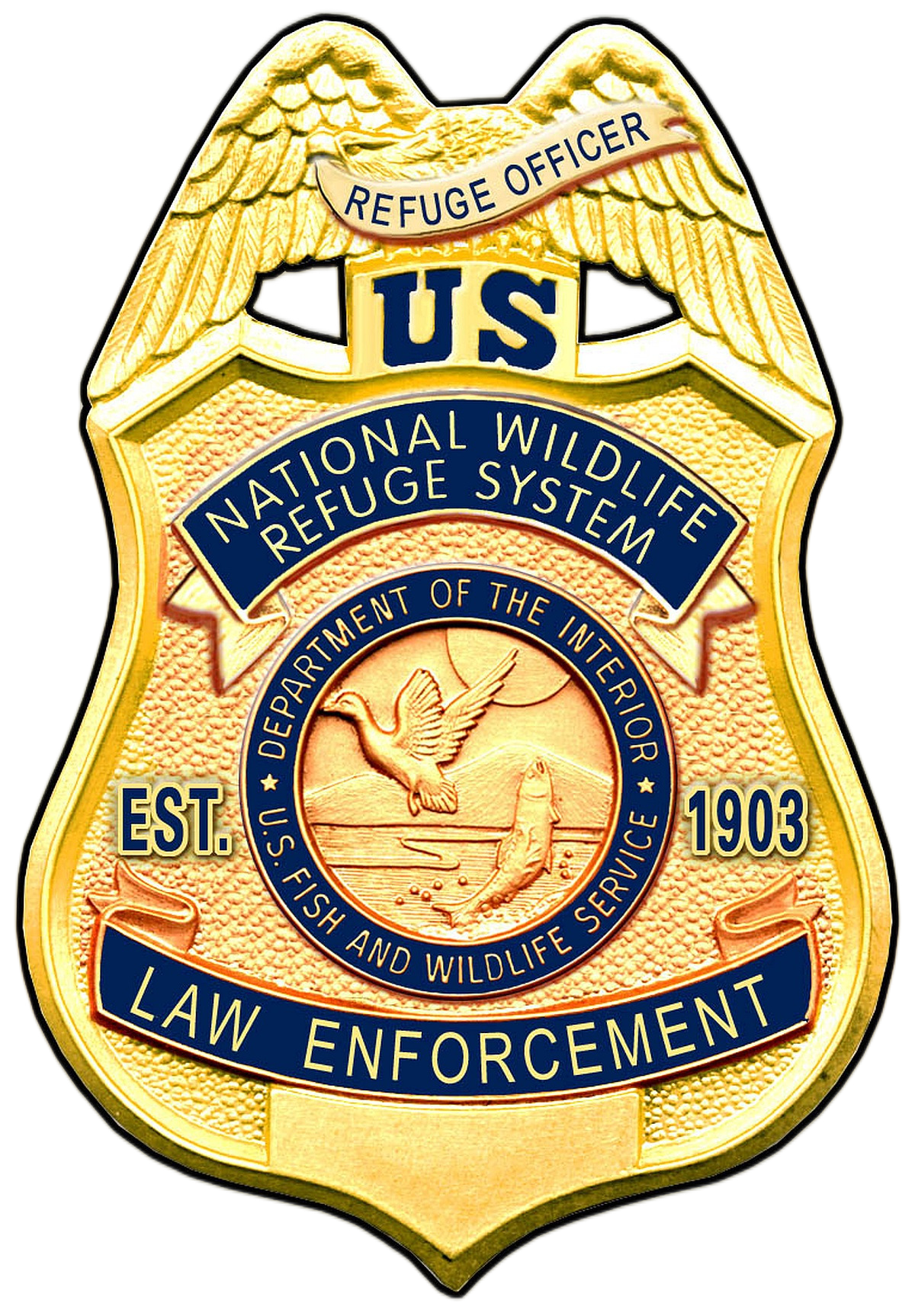
Federal Wildlife Officer badge

The refuge system has a professional cadre of law enforcement officers that supports a broad spectrum of service programs by enforcing conservation laws established to protect the fish, wildlife, cultural, and archaeological resources the service manages in trust for the American people. They also educate the public about the FWS's mission, contribute to environmental education and outreach, provide safety and security for the visiting public, assist local communities with law enforcement and natural disaster response and recovery through emergency management programs, and help protect native subsistence rights. They are routinely involved with the greater law enforcement community in cooperative efforts to combat the nation's drug problems, address border security issues, and aid in other security challenges.

Prevention and control of wildland fires is also a part of refuge management. Completion of controlled burns to reduce fuel loading, and participation in the interagency wildland fire suppression efforts, are vital for management of refuge lands.

== Geographical data ==
The area of the refuge system is heavily influenced by large areas devoted to protecting wild Alaska and to protecting marine habitats in the Pacific and Atlantic Oceans; however, the number of units and public visitation overwhelmingly occurs in the lower 48 states, though these refuges and wetland management districts constitute only about 2% of the area of the system.

- Area of land and water under management: 856 million acres
- Number of management units: 568 refuges, 38 wetland management districts, 5 marine national monuments
- Number of wilderness areas: 74
- Area of wilderness: 20.7 million acres (about 20% of overall federal wilderness)
- Length of rivers within the National Wild and Scenic Rivers System: 1,086 miles (1,748 km)
- Length of refuge boundary with Mexico: 120 miles (190 km)

Geographic area	No. of units	Size of NWRS (Sept 30, 2022)	Notes
State of Alaska	16	76.8 million acres	9% of total Refuge System acreage is in Alaska; 18% of Alaska is set aside as national wildlife refuges
Hawaii and Pacific Marine Areas	27	759.7 million acres	About 88% of System acres are in 5 Marine National Monuments consisting mostly of coral reefs and open ocean (4 Pacific and 1 Atlantic). Acres here include 19.1 million Pacific acres managed under authorities other than the Refuge System Administration Act.
Puerto Rico, Virgin Islands, Navassa NWR	9	0.4 million acres	Largest refuge is Navassa Island, which is nearly 365,000 acres
Lower 48 states	559	19.1 million acres	2% of NWRS acres are in the lower 48 states; 1% of the area of the lower 48 states is within the NWRS; by unit count, 92% of refuges are in the lower 48; 521 are refuges (14.69 million acres) and 38 are wetland management districts (4.44 million acres).
Entire refuge system	611	856 million acres	568 refuges, 38 wetland management districts, and 5 marine national monuments

Today's Refuge System (September 30, 2022 data) has been assembled through a variety of different administrative and funding mechanisms. Setting aside the sections of Marine National Monuments outside refuge boundaries (685.7 million of the 759 million total acres in Marine National Monuments), leaves 151 million acres of the more traditional Refuges and Wetland Management Districts. These 151 million acres were acquired as follows:

- 93% (140 million acres) was withdrawn from the public domain or transferred from another federal entity (within this amount, 1.2 million acres of former military bases have become part of the Refuge System)
- 4% (6 million acres) was acquired using funds from the popular "Duck Stamp" program
- 1.14% (1.7 million acres) was acquired with funds from the Land and Water Conservation Fund
- 0.46% (694 thousand acres) was acquired using other funds
- 1.13% (1.7 million acres) was acquired through donations (although relatively modest in terms of acreage [0.27% of refuge acres and 9.3% of wetland management district acres], 58% of refuges and 70% of the counties in wetland management districts had land donated to them)

As of September 30, 2019, the refuges had 15,257 roads, bridges, and trails; 5,204 buildings; 8,407 water management structures; and 8,414 other structures such as visitor facility enhancements (hunting blinds, fishing piers, boat docks, observation decks, and information kiosks). The overall facility infrastructure is valued at over $36 billion.

== Special designation areas ==
In addition to refuge status, the "special" status of lands within individual refuges may be recognized by additional designations, either legislatively or administratively. Special designation may also occur through the actions of other legitimate agencies or organizations. The influence that special designations may have on the management of refuge lands and waters may vary considerably.

Special designation areas within the refuge system as of September 30, 2014, included:

- Biosphere reserves (3 units)
- Maine Protected Areas (106 units)
- National Historic Landmarks (10 units)
- National Monuments (7 units)
- National Natural Landmarks (43 units)
- National Recreation Trails (72 units)
- National Wild and Scenic Rivers (13 units)
- Ramsar wetlands of international importance (26 units)
- Research natural areas (207 units)
- Western Hemisphere Shorebird Reserve Network (19 units)
- Wilderness areas (74 units) (the system has 20.7 million acres of wilderness, 19% of U.S. wilderness)
- World Heritage sites (1 unit)

== See also ==
- Congressional Wildlife Refuge Caucus
- National Wildlife Refuge Association
- State wildlife trails
- National Wilderness Preservation System
