= National Wildlife Refuge Association =

US non-profit organization

- Abbreviation: NWRA
- Formation: 1975; 51 years ago
- Type: Non-profit organization
- Headquarters: Washington, D.C.
- Region served: United States
- President: Geoffrey L. Haskett
- Website: www.refugeassociation.org

The National Wildlife Refuge Association (NWRA) is an independent non-profit 501(c)(3) membership organization that works to conserve American wildlife by strengthening and expanding the 150-million-acre (610,000 km^{2}) National Wildlife Refuge System managed by the United States Fish and Wildlife Service. NWRA’s mission is to engage and mobilize volunteers in building support for refuges, educate decision-makers in Washington, and lead diverse conservation partnerships designed to amplify the impact that refuges have in protecting wildlife habitat both within and beyond their formal boundaries.

Founded in 1975, by former National Wildlife Refuge System managers and employees, the NWRA is the only national advocacy organization dedicated to promoting and protecting the National Wildlife Refuge System.

== Advocacy ==
NWRA is the chair of the Cooperative Alliance for Refuge Enhancement (CARE), a coalition of 24 wildlife, sporting, science and conservation organizations.

=== Izembek Refuge Road ===
NWRA led efforts to stop construction of a road through federally designated wilderness in the Izembek National Wildlife Refuge in Alaska, publishing its "Road to Nowhere" report in 2008.

=== Mississippi River power line ===
In 2024, the NWRA sued to block the construction of clean-energy transmission lines through a Mississippi River wildlife refuge that would have connected more than 160 renewable energy projects to the Midwestern energy grid. The energy company behind the transmission line had made an agreement with the U.S. Interior Department and U.S. Army Corps of Engineers to add 35 acres of land to the refuge in exchange for using the 20 acres of refuge land in the path of the transmission line.
