= Soybean industry in Paraguay =

In recent years, the soybean industry has grown exponentially in South America, primarily in Brazil and Argentina (South America’s two largest countries) and Uruguay and Paraguay. Paraguay has benefitted from the results of this explosive growth through economic expansion.

== History of soybeans in Paraguay ==
Soy was introduced in the country in 1921. The earliest known document to mention soybeans in Paraguay or the cultivation of soybeans in Paraguay was published in 1940.

By the late 1970s, Paraguay was a major soybean power in the Americas. In 1978, R.C. Schroeder wrote that Paraguay and other Latin American nations were gaining market share in the international soybean market where the United States had enjoyed a virtual monopoly for decades.

== Soybean demand ==
The fastest growing import markets in soybeans for Paraguay between 2019 and 2020 were Brazil ($685k)and Argentina ($489k). The United States soy trade has had little influence on South America’s production because the U.S. grows enough to meet its own demand. Nonetheless, the demand from Asia has been vast enough to spur a 69% increase in Paraguay’s soy production over the past five years, making Paraguay the world’s third largest exporter of soy.

As land value rises in Paraguay, Brazilian and Argentine farmers with the funds and means to support large industry have been crossing the border into Paraguay. While Brazilian and Argentine farmers work to expand the soybean trade, they bring disastrous results as they clear land and extend production further and further and eventually across the border into eastern Paraguay. This influx of farmers has resulted in the displacement of tens of thousands of peasants and small farmers. These campesinos claim they have been unjustly uprooted by Brazilian and Argentine landowners.

== Soybean production ==
In 2020, Paraguay exported $2.15B in Soybeans, making it the fourth largest exporter of soybeans in the world. Soybeans were the most exported product in Paraguay. In 2019, Paraguay's main exporting competitors in soybeans were: Brazil ($28.6B), United States ($25.6B), and Argentina ($2.31B).

=== 2020s drought ===
Paraguay's production was expected to reach barely 2.97 million tons in 2022, 68% less than in 2020/21. The average yield was only 900 kg/ha, the lowest figure in Paraguay's history, which led to increased idling of soybean oil processing plants.
