= Cornell bread =

Cornell Bread
- Type: Bread
- Place of origin: United States
- Created by: Clive McCay
- Main ingredients: Flour, Soy flour, Powdered milk, Wheat germ

Cornell bread was invented in the United States during the 1930s by Clive McCay, a professor at Cornell University, as an inexpensive alternative to strictly rationed foods. Adding powdered milk and soy flour to bread increases its protein content, and restoring the germ to refined white flour results in higher levels of vitamins and minerals.

The recipe for the bread was published in a book co-authored by McCay and his wife, entitled The Cornell Bread Book: 54 Recipes for Nutritious Loaves, Rolls & Coffee Cakes.

== See also ==
- Brown bread
- Graham cracker
- Graham bread
- Health food
- List of breads
