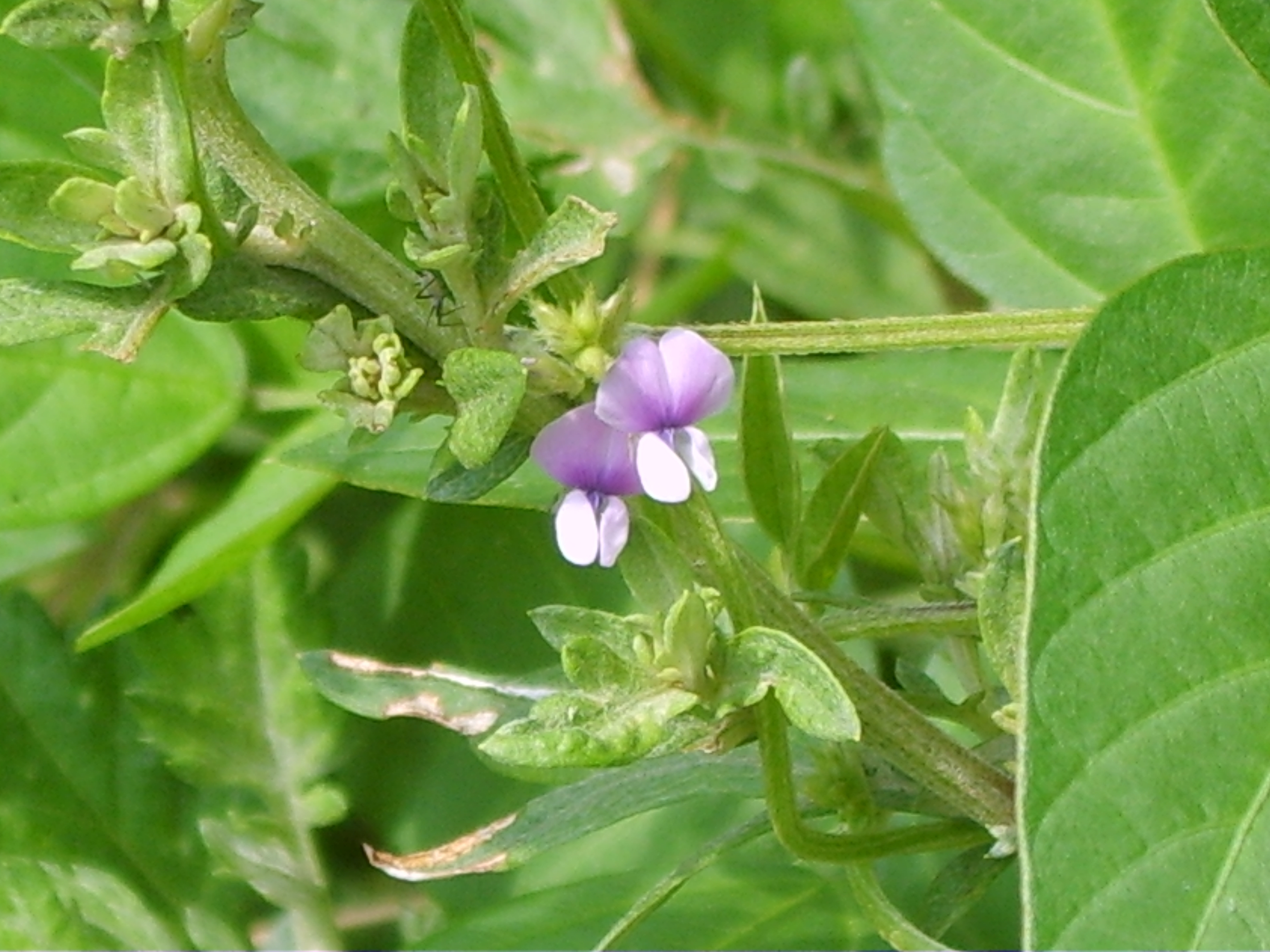

Scientific classification
- Kingdom: Plantae
- Clade: Tracheophytes
- Clade: Angiosperms
- Clade: Eudicots
- Clade: Rosids
- Order: Fabales
- Family: Fabaceae
- Subfamily: Faboideae
- Genus: Glycine
- Species: G. soja

Binomial name
- Glycine soja Siebold & Zucc.

Synonyms
- Glycine max subsp. soja (Siebold & Zucc.) H.Ohashi; Glycine ussuriensis Regel & Maack

= Glycine soja =

Species of legume

Glycine soja, known as wild soybean, is an annual plant in the family Fabaceae. It may be treated as a separate species, the closest living relative of the cultivated soybean, Glycine max, an important crop, or as a subspecies of the cultivated soybean, Glycine max subsp. soja.

The plant is native to eastern China, Japan, Korea and far-eastern Russia.

Much work into Aphis glycines resistance in this genus has been done by Hill et al. They found that this species has resistance genetics not found in G. max (cultivated varieties). This may make G. soja useful as a wild relative for introgression of aphid resistance.

== Stress Tolerance Mechanisms ==
Glycine soja features numerous accessions (unique germplasm samples stored in a seed bank) that illustrates its potential adaptability to abiotic stress. For example, Salt-tolerance mechanisms in Glycine soja are under evaluation by researchers because salinity negatively affects crop yield and survival. A study done by Yang et al. compares the effects of salt stress on a salt-tolerant accession of Glycine soja. Metabolomic analysis revealed an increase in organic compounds accumulated in the plant’s cytoplasm, which supported its adaptability under salt-stress.This provides insight into possible genetic applications to combat environmental salinity and improve crop survivability.
