= Clive McCay =

American biochemist, nutritionist and gerontologist

- Born: 21 March 1898; Winamac, Indiana, United States
- Died: 8 June 1967 (aged 69); Englewood, Florida, United States
- Known for: calorie restriction life extension
- Scientific career
- Workplaces: Cornell University

Clive Maine McCay (21 March 1898 – 8 June 1967) was an American biochemist, nutritionist and gerontologist.

== Biography ==
McCay was professor of animal husbandry at Cornell University from 1927 to 1963. His main interest was the influence of nutrition on aging. He is best known for his work in proving that caloric restriction increases the life span of rats, which is seen as seminal in triggering further research and experiments in the field of nutrition and longevity. Scientists are still trying to understand the connection between caloric restriction and longevity.

Following his discovery between a low calorie diet and longevity, McCay played a prominent role in the development of nutritionally-sound rations during World War II, and the creation of Cornell Bread, designed for high protein and vitamin content, similar to the meal fed to mice in longevity experiments.

Another of McCay's important contributions was the first work in heterochronic parabiosis: the joining of the circulatory systems of a young and an old animal, which leads to rejuvenating effects on the tissues of the old animal and degenerative changes in the young's, thus demonstrating the role of systemic factors in aging. Limited work with this paradigm by others continued into the early 1970s before languishing, until it was finally taken up again by researchers at Stanford University and the University of California at Berkeley in the mid-2000s.

His further research centered on canine nutrition, and fluoride and its use in water treatment. A 1957 study on fluoridation showed that low levels (1-10 ppm) of sodium fluoride added to the drinking water of rats did not have carie-protective effects.

== Selected publications ==
- The Nutritional Requirements of Dogs (1940)
- Nutrition, Ageing and Longevity (1942)
- Nutrition of the Dog (1946)
- The Cornell Bread Book (with Jeanette B. McCay, 1955)
- Clive McCay, Nutrition Pioneer: Biographical Memoirs by His Wife (Jeanette B. McCay, 1994)
