= Soy whey =

Liquid by-product of tofu production

Soy whey is the clear liquid obtained after curdling the proteins in soy milk to form tofu (tofu whey), or after curdling out the proteins in a soy extract to make soy protein isolate (SPI whey). It is named in analogy to the clear liquid by-product from cheese production, whey. It is traditionally treated as wastewater, though some work has been done to try and produce more valuable products out of it.

== Composition ==
Tofu whey may contain components of the soy milk as well as the coagulant used, which could be either acid-based or mineral-based. It contains 0.85% carbohydrates (largely stachyose, raffinose, and sucrose; no lactose), 0.13–0.82% protein, 0.4–1% fat, and about 0.4% minerals (as ash).

Soy protein isolate is made by curdling proteins out of a weakly alkaline, aqueous extract of defatted soy using an acid. SPI whey contains 0.95% carbohydrates, 0.03–0.3% protein, no fat (because defatted soy is used to make the extract), and about 0.2% minerals (as ash).

Besides these components, soy whey also contains isoflavones, which are potentially valuable.

== Applications ==
Very little has been done commercially in transforming soy whey into more valuable products.

The minerals in tofu whey can be recovered for reuse as tofu coagulant. The carbohydrates in soy whey, especially the oligosacchides, are functional food ingredients. The proteins have good emulsifying properties.

A number of different organisms can be used to ferment soy whey to produce a drink. Soy whey with added sugar can be fermented with yeast into a wine similar to sake. Soy whey can be fermented with lactic acid bacteria to obtain a sour drink, or to obtain a sauerkraut starter. This liquid can also support the growth of fungi (including mushrooms and yeasts) and microalgae.
