= National Plant Germplasm System =

Network of institutions conserving genetic material

The U.S. National Plant Germplasm System
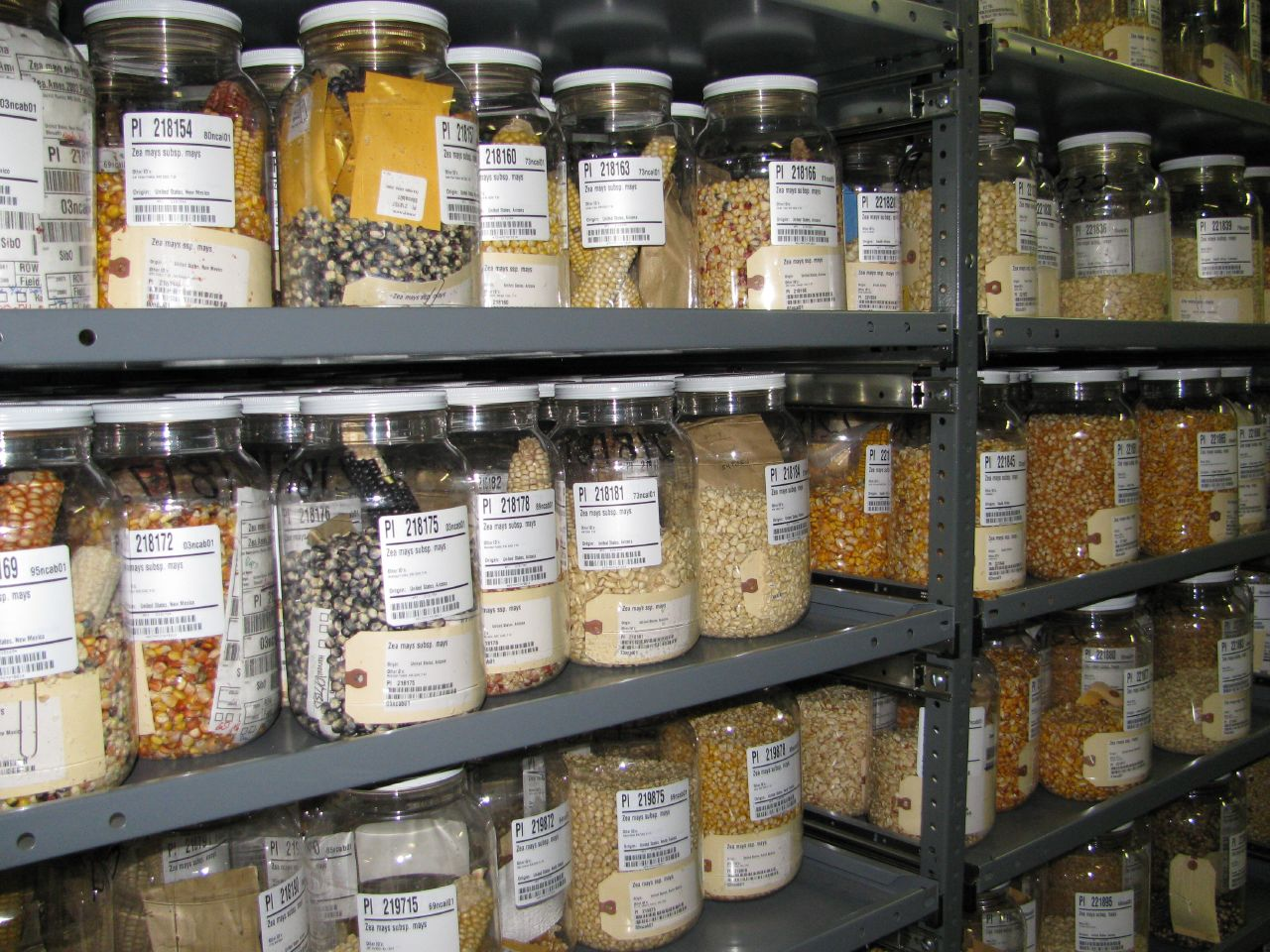
- Maize Collection at the North Central Regional Plant Introduction Station

Agency overview
- Formed: January 1, 1974; 52 years ago
- Preceding agencies: Agriculture Division of the U.S. Patent Office; Section of Seed and Plant Introduction
- Parent department: United States Department of Agriculture
- Parent agency: Agricultural Research Service
- Website: National Plant Germplasm System

Overview of the U.S. National Plant Germplasm System, produced by the USDA

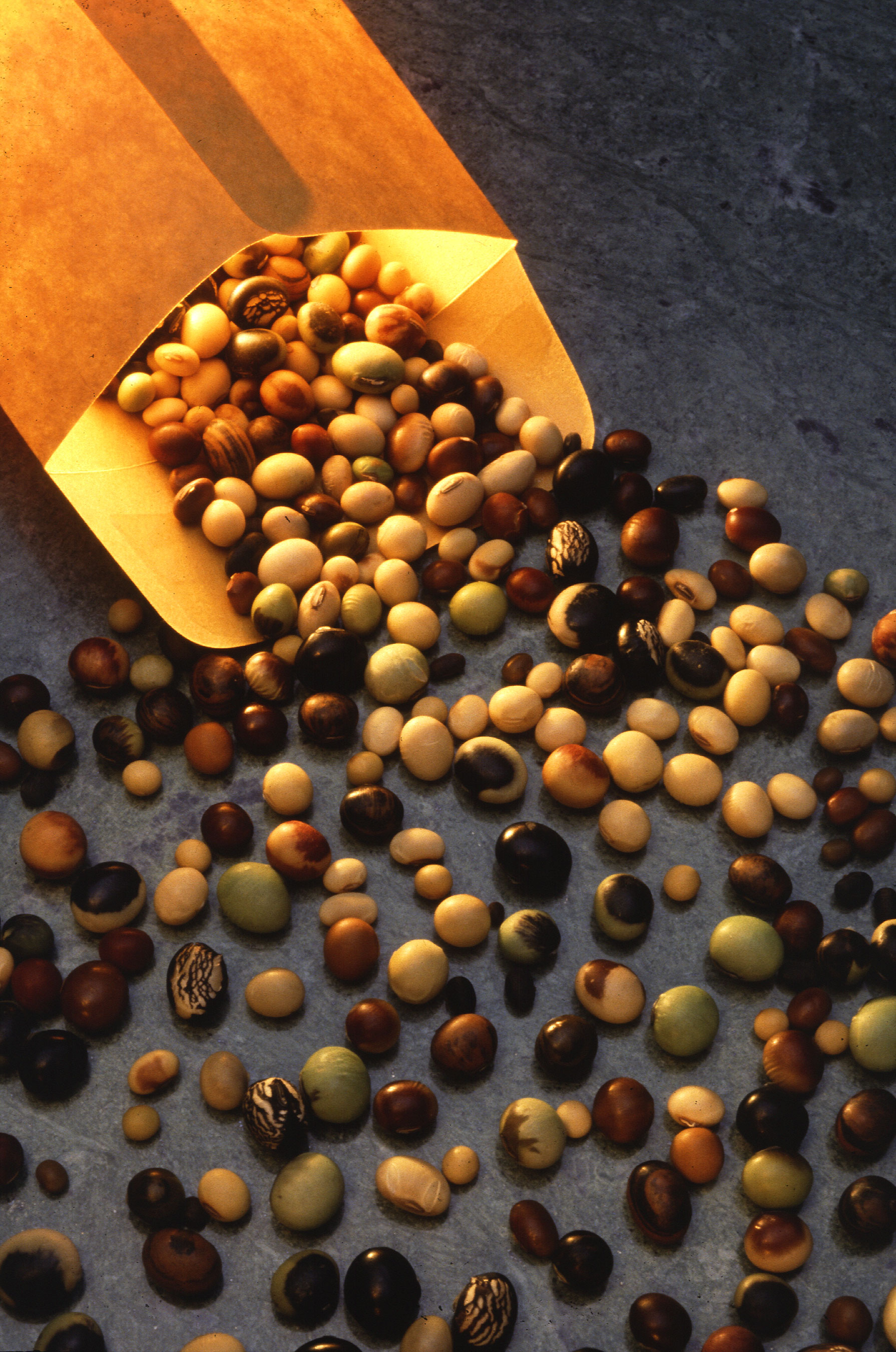
Image depicting different varieties of soybean seeds from the USDA National Soybean Germplasm Collection

The U.S. National Plant Germplasm System (NPGS) is a coordinated network of federal, state, and private institutions administered by the USDA's Agricultural Research Service (ARS). Its mission is to conserve the genetic diversity of agriculturally important plants while facilitating the use of germplasm (seeds and other propagative materials) for research, breeding, and educational purposes.

The NPGS operates 27 specialized sites, each responsible for one or more crop collections. Long-term backup storage is provided by the National Laboratory for Genetic Resources Preservation (NLGRP). All NPGS collections are linked through the centralized Germplasm Resources Information Network (GRIN) database. The National Germplasm Resources Laboratory (NGRL) in Beltsville, MD, manages the GRIN database and coordinates 40 Crop Germplasm Committees (CGCs)—composed of crop specialists that provide guidance to the curators of each major crop collection.

It has been called a "living library" — and America's safeguard against "famine on a global scale."

== Introduction ==
Global food production has shifted dramatically from diverse indigenous agriculture and traditional food systems toward intensive, large-scale agricultural practices. Since the Columbian Exchange and the Industrial Revolution, this intensification has increasingly relied on cultivating fewer crop species with uniform characteristics to accommodate mechanized farming and mass production. While these practices offer benefits such as efficiency, higher yields, and streamlined harvesting, they also come with serious risks. The reduction in genetic variability makes crops more vulnerable to pests, diseases, and environmental stresses—threatening food security and resilience in the face of climate change and evolving agricultural challenges.

Agricultural research, specifically plant breeding, addresses food security by developing new crop varieties with improved agronomic traits. This process relies fundamentally on genetic diversity, which enables the transfer of beneficial traits from one plant to another. Such diversity is found in local landraces and their crop wild relatives—plants that have evolved over time through adaptation to specific environmental and cultural conditions, often in isolation from other populations. The NPGS supports agricultural research by acquiring, conserving, evaluating, documenting, and distributing diverse germplasm—including wild species, landraces, improved cultivars, and breeding lines.

=== Background ===
Historical agricultural events have demonstrated the risks associated with reliance on a limited genetic pool. When genetic diversity is restricted, crops become more vulnerable to pests, pathogens, and environmental changes, leading to widespread yield losses and food shortages. Maintaining diverse seed collections in genebanks ensures that scientists and breeders have access to a broad genetic pool, allowing them to develop disease-resistant and climate-resilient crop varieties.

One of the most well-known examples of the dangers of genetic uniformity is the Great Famine of Ireland (1845–1852). Ireland's reliance on a single potato variety, which lacked resistance to Phytophthora infestans, led to massive crop failures following the outbreak of late blight. With no genetic diversity to provide resistance, the disease spread uncontrollably, causing a famine that resulted in over a million deaths and forced mass emigration. To this day the Irish population remains below its nineteenth century peak. This catastrophe underscores the importance of preserving diverse genetic resources to ensure future crops have the necessary resistance to unforeseen threats.

More recent threats include the emergence of wheat stem rust Ug99, first identified in Uganda in 1999. This highly virulent strain of Puccinia graminis has demonstrated the ability to overcome resistance genes present in many widely cultivated wheat varieties. Its spread presents a significant challenge to wheat production, particularly in regions of Africa and Asia where wheat is a dietary staple. Access to a diverse collection of wheat genetic resources has allowed researchers to identify and breed resistant varieties, highlighting the critical role of seed banks in combating emerging plant diseases. Soybean rust, another devastating plant disease, was introduced to the U.S. in 2004 when Hurricane Ivan carried fungal spores of Phakopsora pachyrhizi from South America. The pathogen spreads rapidly under favorable environmental conditions and can cause substantial yield losses in soybean crops. Breeding resistant cultivars relies heavily on the availability of plant genetic resources, highlighting the importance of maintaining extensive germplasm collections to mitigate agricultural threats.

The importance of safeguarding genetic resources was exemplified during the Siege of Leningrad (1941–1944), one of the longest and most brutal blockades in history. Scientists at the Vavilov Institute of Plant Industry in modern-day Saint Petersburg, home to one of the world's largest seed collections, protected their precious crop genetic resources even as famine gripped the city. Despite extreme hunger, many scientists refused to consume the seeds, recognizing their value for future generations. Several scientists ultimately starved to death rather than eat the stored seeds, ensuring that these vital genetic resources survived the war. Their sacrifice highlights the critical importance of preserving agricultural biodiversity, not just for immediate food security but for the long-term survival of human civilization.

These historical and modern examples illustrate that conserving crop genetic diversity is not just about preserving plant varieties—it is a necessary safeguard against famine and disease. Gene banks and breeding programs provide the foundation for developing resilient crops, ensuring agricultural sustainability and global food security in the face of evolving threats.

== History of Plant Introductions to the U.S. ==
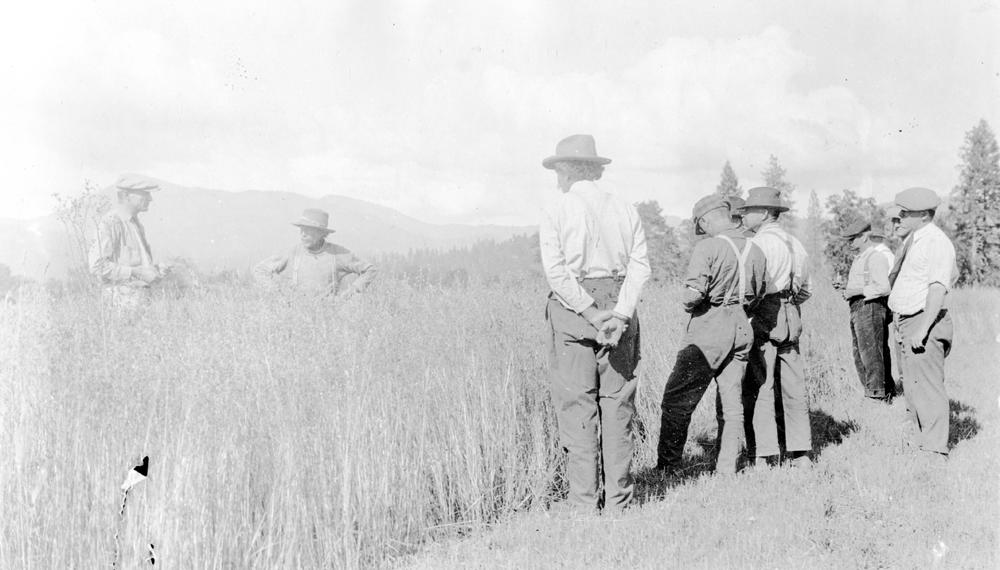
Crop specialist, E. R. Jackman explaining variety differences of oats to a group of farmers (1923)

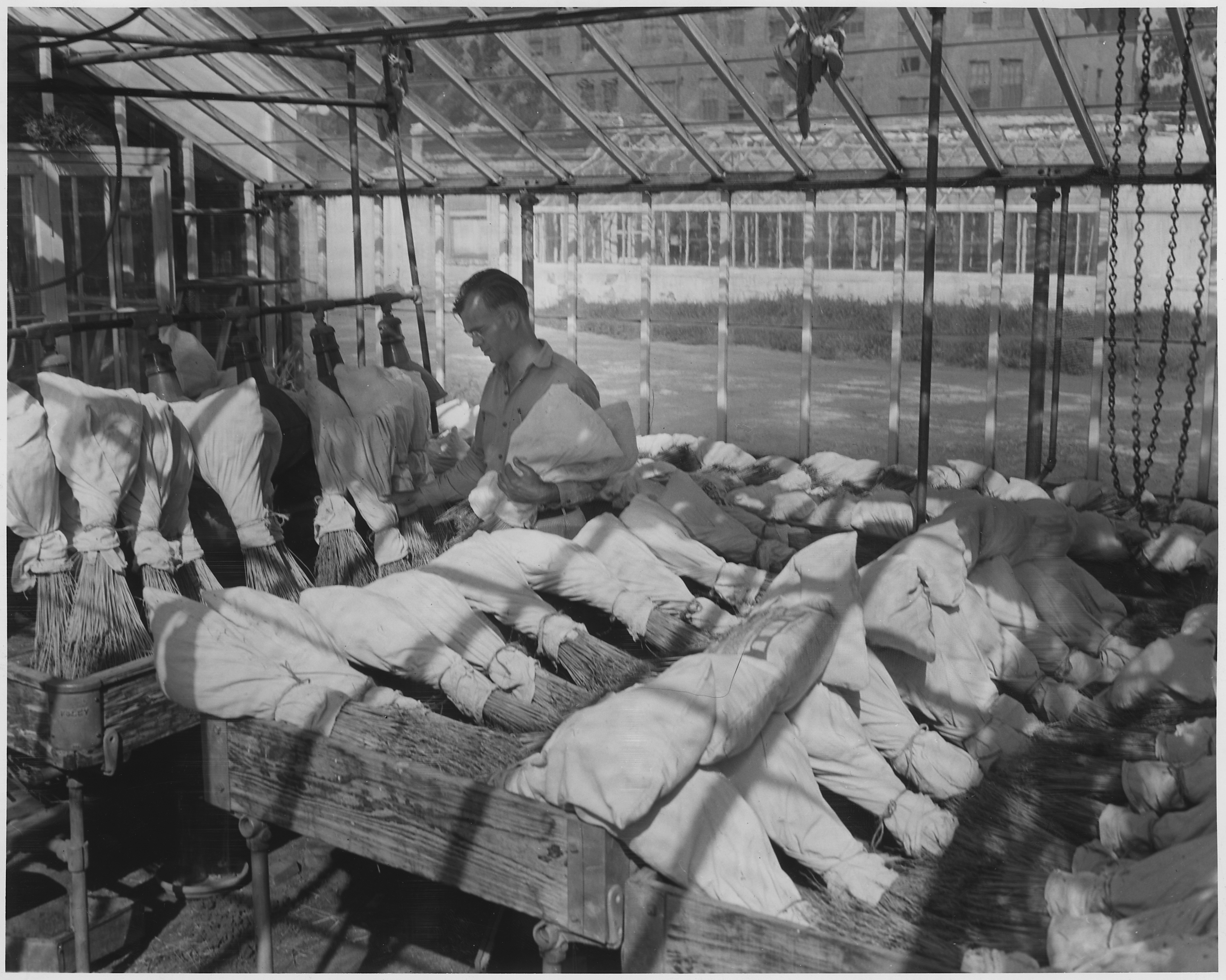
USDA plant breeder, Harold H. Flor, selects new varieties of flax at the North Dakota Agricultural Experiment Station, Fargo, ND

Here a plant introduction refers to the importation of living plants for agricultural and economic use.

The history of plant introduction and exploration in the U.S. has been reviewed in numerous publications.

=== Colonial Settlement ===
With the arrival of European settlers in the Americas, indigenous food systems were largely displaced by domesticated crops familiar to Europeans. Seeking to recreate their agricultural traditions, settlers introduced a variety of grains, fruits, and vegetables to the New World, aiming to cultivate the land in ways that mirrored European practices. Lyman Carrier, in Beginnings of Agriculture in America, quotes an Englishman's letter:

"I have in sundry places sown Wheate, Barlie, Rie, Oates, Beanes, Pease, and seeds of herbs, kernels, Plumstones, nuts, all of which prospered as in England."

As interest grew among farmers and botanical enthusiasts for new plants and diverse crops, the government gradually took on an active role in the introduction and exploration of plant material—efforts that had previously been driven by individuals and agricultural societies. Pioneering figures such as John Bartram, Henry Laurens, Benjamin Franklin, and Thomas Jefferson played a key role in early American plant exploration and exchange. During this period, plant exchange relied on statesman and wealthy landowners to import seeds for cultivation. Jefferson received annual seed shipments from André Thouin, head gardener at the Jardin des Plantes in Paris, to experiment at his Monticello estate.

One of the earliest institutional efforts, the Trustees' Garden in what is now Savannah, Georgia, was established in 1733 as an experimental site to test the adaptability of agricultural plants to the American climate. The oldest surviving botanical garden in North America, Bartram's Garden founded in 1728, is believed to contain the last of three original ginkgoes introduced in 1785 to the United States from China, via London. The Royal Botanic Gardens at Kew, established by Joseph Banks in the 1770s, became an imperial hub for plant distribution to British Colonies. With the support of plant collectors like David Nelson and naturalists such as John Ellis, Kew Gardens helped facilitate the movement of valuable plants to the New World. In 1785, John Beale Bordley encouraged the formation of the Philadelphia Society for Promoting Agriculture—the oldest agricultural society in the United States—to promote the best methods of scientific farming practice. These early agricultural societies played a critical role in the development of American agriculture, acting in many ways as precursors to state and federal agricultural agencies. They served as hubs for sharing knowledge, conducting agricultural experiments, and facilitating the exchange of seeds and plants among farmers.

=== Early United States ===
In 1819, the U.S. government officially recognized the importance of plant introductions when the Secretary of the Treasury issued a circular directing American naval officers and consular officials stationed in foreign countries to collect and send seeds of useful plants back to the United States.

"The introduction of useful plants, not before cultivated, or of such as are of superior quality to those which have been previously introduced, is an object of great importance to every civilized state, but more particularly to one recently organized, in which progress of improvements of every kind has not to contend with ancient and deep-rooted prejudices." – William H. Crawford

This marked the beginning of formal federal support for plant industries. In 1818, Congress chartered the Columbian Institute for the Promotion of Arts and Sciences to help modernize American farming practices, followed in 1820 by the establishment of the U.S. Botanic Garden in Washington, D.C. as a national plant science institution.

Between 1838 and 1842, William Rich, serving as the official botanist aboard the Wilkes Expedition, embarked on a global voyage to the Pacific with the objective of securing noteworthy agricultural seeds, roots, and plants. The extensive botanical collections gathered during the expedition led to the construction of a two-section, 50-foot greenhouse behind the Patent Office Building to house and study the specimens—nearly 500 different species and over 1,000 individual plants representing 254 species.

In July 1838, Congress granted Henry Perrine a parcel of land on Indian Key in the Florida Keys with the explicit purpose of introducing useful tropical plants for cultivation in the U.S. Perrine successfully introduced around 200 tropical plant species; among these, the Key lime stands out for its lasting impact. After Henry Perrine's death, his original land grant was relocated by his wife to Coconut Grove, Florida. Today, this site is home to the USDA Agricultural Research Service (ARS) Subtropical Horticultural Research Station, one of the oldest NPGS genebank sites.

Between 1836 and 1862, the U.S. Patent Office—first under the Department of State and later the Department of the Interior—administered a plant collection and distribution program. Henry L. Ellsworth, Commissioner of Patents, successfully petitioned Congress in 1839 for $1,000 annually for an Agriculture Division to support farming. These funds were used to collect seeds and distribute them through the U.S. Postal Service. Ellsworth earned the title "Father of the United States Department of Agriculture" for these efforts. By 1848, the Agricultural Section of the Patent Office was conducting agricultural experiments, procuring agricultural statistics and had distributed 250,000 packages of seeds. Today, the USDA has expanded this mission to include plant breeders and scientists around the world in the public, private, and nongovernmental organization sectors, distributing over 250,000 seed samples annually.

The U.S. Department of Agriculture (USDA) was officially established in 1862 when President Abraham Lincoln signed the Department of Agriculture Organic Act into law. Among the department's initial seven mandates was the collection, testing, and distribution of seeds and plants.

"There is hereby established at the seat of Government of the United States a Department of Agriculture, the general designs and duties of which shall be to acquire and to diffuse among the people of the United States useful information in subjects connected with agriculture in the most general and comprehensive sense of that word, and to procure, propagate, and distribute among the people new and valuable seeds and plants."

Isaac Newton was appointed Commissioner of the newly formed USDA. Under Newton's leadership, the U.S. Propagation Gardens was created to propagate and test new plant materials to determine their suitability for cultivation in the United States. This initiative laid the groundwork for organized plant introduction and evaluation. Newton appointed William Saunders as the first Superintendent of the Division of Experimental Gardens and Grounds. Saunders would go on to have a profound impact: he was a founding member of the National Grange, one of the earliest agricultural advocacy organizations in the U.S.

In 1871, Frederick Watts became Commissioner of Agriculture and significantly expanded scientific research and international engagement by exchanging 3,450 packages of seed with foreign governments and institutions. These exchanges included notable botanical centers such as Kew Gardens in London, the Royal Gardens of Melbourne in Australia, and the Imperial and Royal Ministries of Agricultural Affairs of Austria-Hungary. During this period, the USDA also established several specialized divisions to support agricultural science: Seed (1868), Botany (1869), Forestry (1880), Pomology (1886), Fiber Crops (1890), Vegetable Pathology (1890), and Agrostology (1895).

Initially headed by a Commissioner, the USDA was elevated to Cabinet status in 1889, marking a significant expansion of its scope and influence. In 1897, James Wilson, who would go on to become the longest-serving Cabinet Secretary in U.S. history, took a major step in advancing plant introductions into the United States. Wilson secured $20,000 in federal funding specifically for the study and distribution of plant material.

"...That twenty thousand dollars of the sum thus appropriated... may be used to collect, purchase, test, propagate, and distribute rare and valuable seeds, bulbs, trees, shrubs, vines, cuttings, and plants from foreign countries for experiments with reference to their introduction into this country; and the seeds, bulbs, trees, shrubs, vines, cuttings, and plants thus collected, purchased, tested, and propagated shall not be included in general distribution, but shall be used for experimental tests, to be carried on with the cooperation of agricultural experiment stations..."

This appropriation marked the beginning of a scientific approach to introducing new crops, accelerating the USDA's mission to provide American farmers with improved and diverse crop varieties. At the time, seed was sent almost entirely to members of Congress for distribution directly to the farmers. The USDA began to work with State Agricultural Experiment Stations (SAES) to evaluate new crops in experimental gardens for potential incorporation into U.S. agricultural production. The department also took on a role of promoting new agricultural industries by helping to develop markets for these crops. Commissioner Norman Colman emphasized the value of these efforts, stating that "the increased production of wheat, oats, and other cereals and grasses, has, by reason of the wide distribution of improved varieties, paid tenfold the entire amount expended by the Department of Agriculture since it was established." By 1901, large-scale seed distribution to farmers had shifted to private industry and the SAES system.

=== Twentieth Century ===
A silent film produced by the USDA featuring David Fairchild on a plant expedition to Ceylon, Sumatra, and Java in 1925–1926

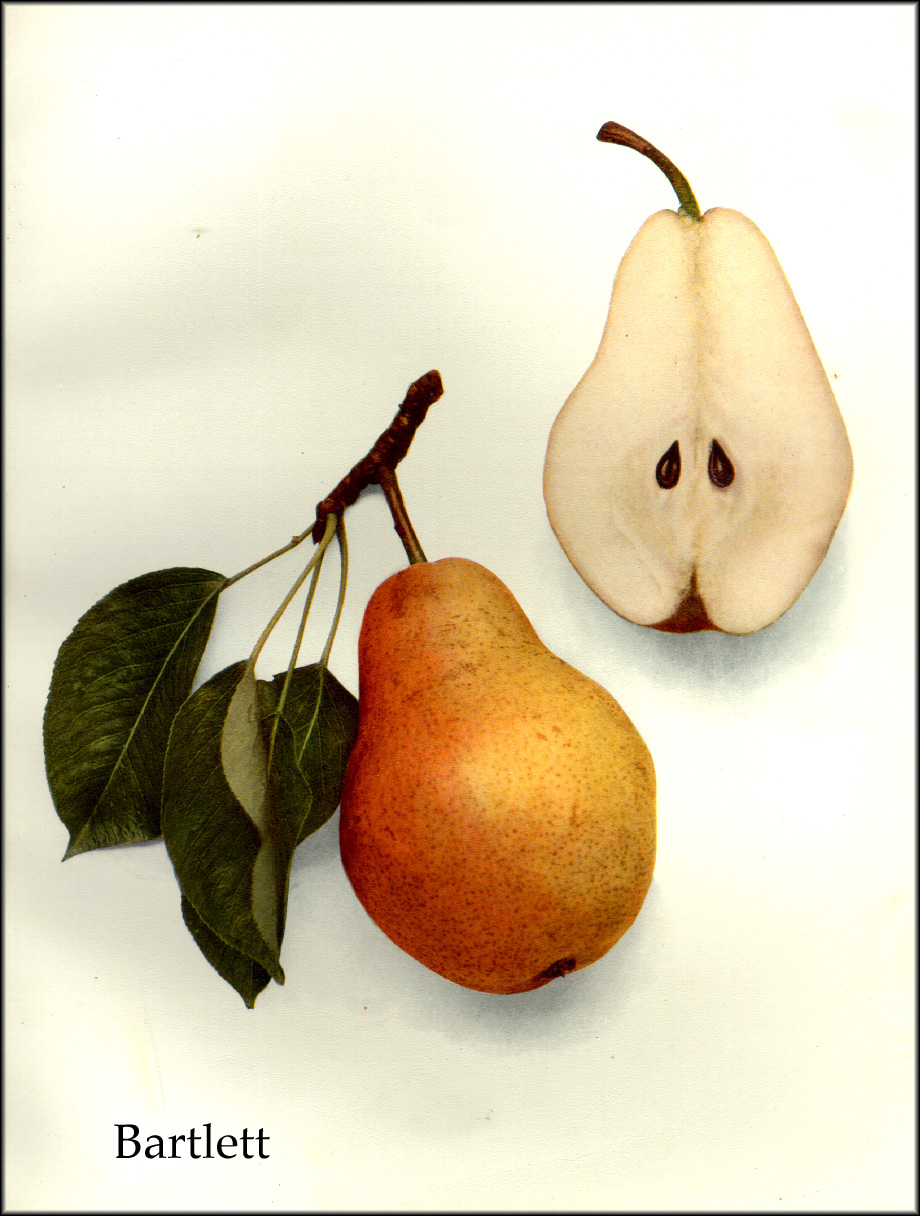
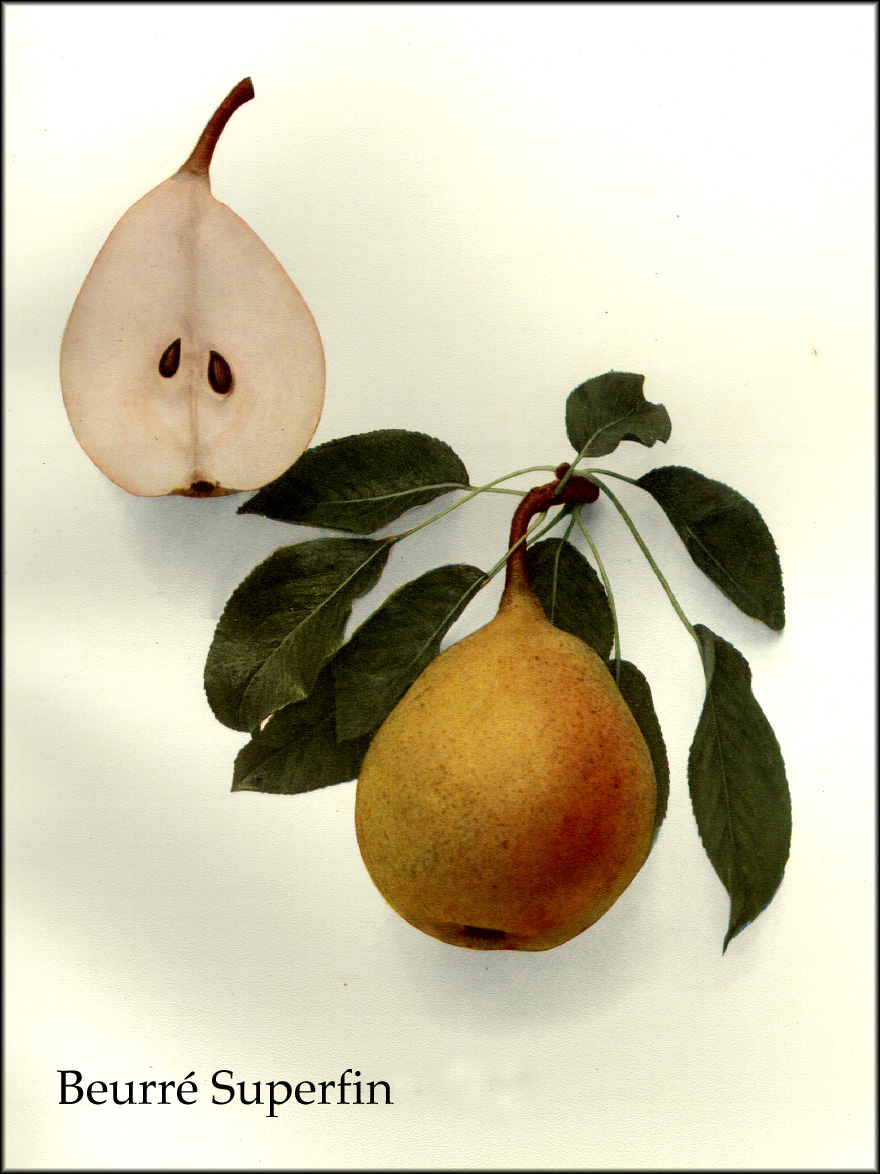
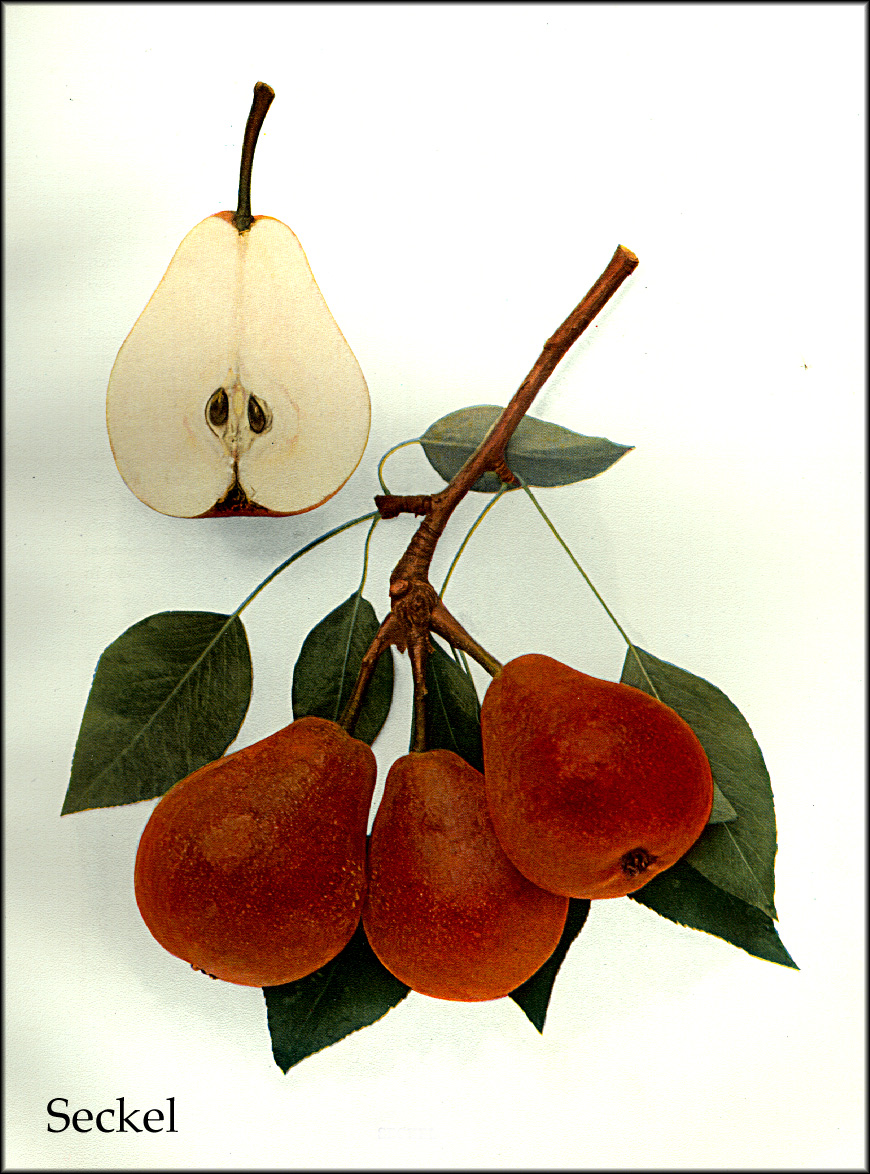
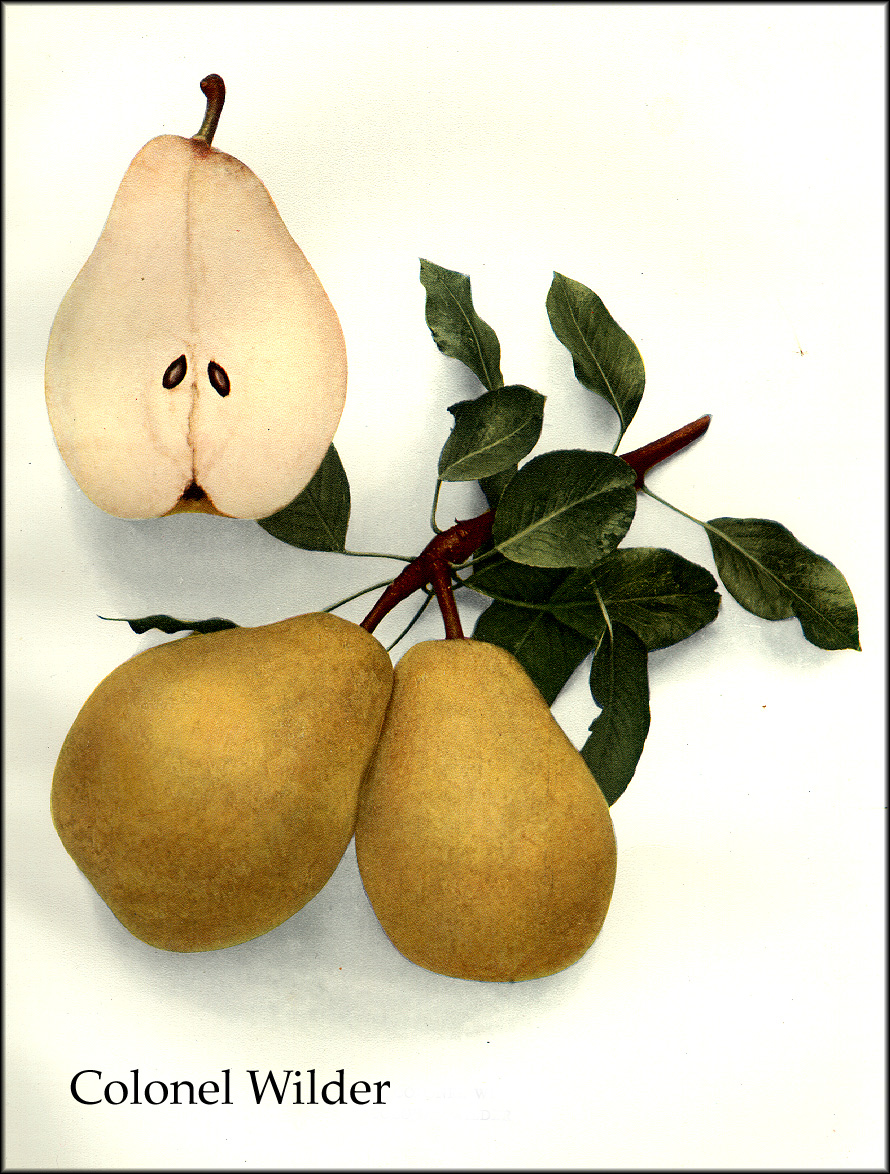
A colour plate from The Pears of New York (1921) depicting various cultivars.

In 1898, the USDA created the Section of Seed and Plant Introduction, later integrated in the Bureau of Plant Industry in 1901. Its mission was to introduce foreign seeds and plants that could improve U.S. agriculture. The Sections founding director David Fairchild launched a global exploration program, employing agricultural explorers like Frank N. Meyer, Niels E. Hansen, Wilson Popenoe and Palemon Howard (P.H.) Dorsett. Their collected materials were documented in the "Inventory of Plants Introduced", a catalog that assigned sequential Plant Introduction (PI) numbers—a system developed by O.F. Cook that included the plant's botanical and common names, collector, origin, and a brief description. This system is still used today in the NPGS, providing a direct link between early plant exploration and modern genebank curation. This systematic approach provides scientific continuity by requiring plant scientists to cite each PI used in their experiments. By 1933, under Fairchild's leadership, the Section had acquired more than 80,000 unique PI accessions (a permanent record of a genetically unique plant from a specific geographic location). These plant introductions include durum wheat, Smyrna fig, Japanese rice, Corsican citron, mango, almonds, Date Palm, Egyptian cotton, and alfalfa to name a few.

Among the most influential plant explorers of the early 20th century was Frank Meyer, who introduced more than 2,500 plant varieties to the United States. He spent thirteen year traveling through eastern and northern China collecting samples for the USDA. In recognition of his contributions, the Meyer Medal, awarded by the Crop Science Society of America, honors individuals for outstanding work in plant genetic resources. Another notable plant explorer was P.H. Dorsett, who, between 1929 and 1930, collected nearly 3,000 soybean accessions from China, Japan, Manchuria, and Korea. At the time, however, there were no dedicated germplasm repositories for long-term preservation; consequently, none of the original 114 Plant Introductions (PIs) were preserved, as they were all distributed for immediate use. Today, just 24 cultivars derived from Dorsett's PI collections remain a part of the U.S. National Soybean Germplasm Collection.

As the number of plant introductions increased, the USDA took steps to support their evaluation and integration into U.S. agriculture. The Section was responsible for distributing new plant materials to State Agricultural Experiment Stations and other scientific cooperators for testing. To further this effort, the USDA established the Laboratory of Plant Life History in 1904, led by W.T. Swingle, and the Office of Dry-Land Agriculture in 1906 to study cultivation practices for new species. Additionally, a network of Federal Plant Introduction Gardens was created to evaluate, propagate, and quarantine introduced plants. The first was founded in Miami, Florida in 1898, followed by gardens in Chico, California (1904), Savannah, Georgia (1919), Glen Dale, Maryland (1919), the latter facility being largely used as a quarantine center to prevent the introduction of plant pests. These gardens served as hubs for short-term propagation and national distribution, though they were not designed for long-term maintenance.

The development of the NPGS unfolded gradually over several decades. The U.S. National Arboretum began operations in Washington, D.C. in 1927. In 1946, Congress passed the Research and Marketing Act, which provided funding to develop new crops suited for different regions of the United States. As a result, four Regional Plant Introduction Stations were established: Ames, Iowa (1947); Geneva, New York (1948); Griffin, Georgia (1949); and Pullman, Washington (1952). Their core responsibilities included acquiring both foreign and native plant germplasm, preserving and evaluating introduced materials, and serving as critical repositories for the nation’s genetic resources. Each station’s mission reflected the agricultural priorities and environmental conditions of its geographic region. Regional Station's were created in partnership with State Agricultural Experiment Stations (SAES) and the Cooperative State Research, Education, and Extension Service (CSREES). Under this joint agreement the SAES provided land, helped establish laboratories, greenhouses, and office space, while USDA and the CSREES provided most of the funding for equipment, operations, and staffing.

Additional facilities further broadened the scope of the National Plant Germplasm System (NPGS). The Inter-regional Introduction Station (now the U.S. Potato Genebank) was established in Sturgeon Bay, Wisconsin (1949). The National Small Grains Collection (1948) in Beltsville, Maryland was later relocated to Aberdeen, Idaho in 1989. Major crop collections were also consolidated into dedicated genebanks during this period, including cotton in College Station, Texas (1955), long-season soybean in Urbana, Illinois (1948), and short-season soybean in Stoneville, Mississippi (1949)—the soybean collections have since been combined into the Urbana, Illinois collection. In 1955, another Inter-regional Introduction Station was founded in Prosser, Washington as a plant quarantine center for fruit and ornamental trees. This facility later became part of the National Clean Plant Network in 2008, supporting the safe exchange and propagation of virus-free plant material.

This expansion marked a significant shift toward the long-term preservation of plant germplasm, ensuring that the effort of earlier plant explorers would not be lost. At the time, it was estimated that only 5–10% of the plant introductions since 1898 remained available in these collections. At the time, germplasm material was sent directly to breeders and researchers for their experiments, with no obligation to maintain them beyond their immediate usefulness. As a result, most germplasm accessions obtained before 1948 are no longer available; however, many important breeding lines and cultivars that were developed still carry genes derived from those early plant introductions. To safeguard these irreplaceable genetic resources, the National Seed Storage Laboratory—now known as the National Laboratory for Genetic Resources Preservation (NLGRP)—was established in 1958 in Fort Collins, Colorado. Unlike the Regional Stations, which focus on the active distribution of materials to plant breeders and researchers, the NLGRP serves as the nation's primary backup storage facility.

== Current Operation ==
U.S. National Plant Germplasm System Collections

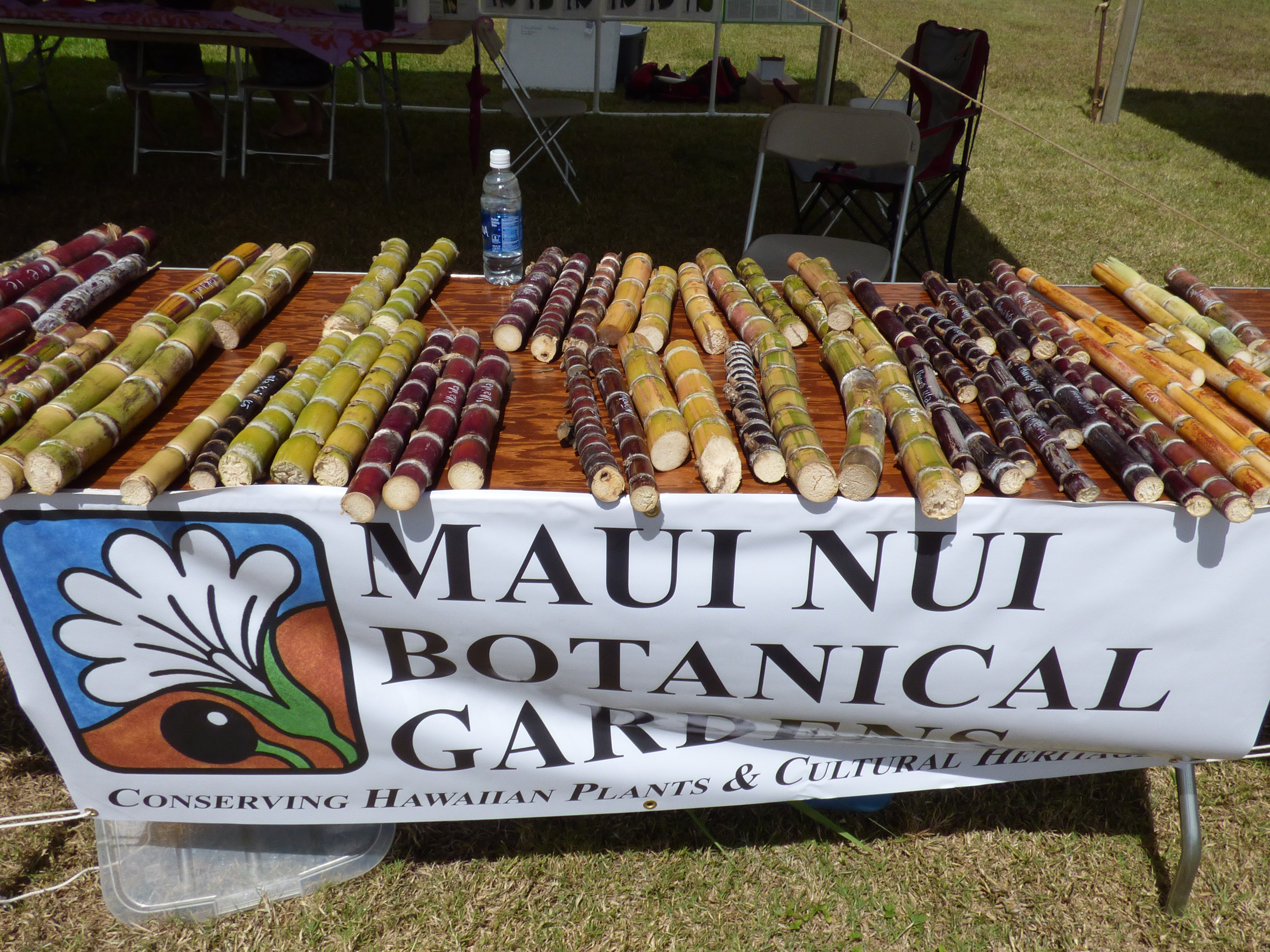
Exhibit of different varieties of sugarcane from the Maui Nui Botanical Gardens

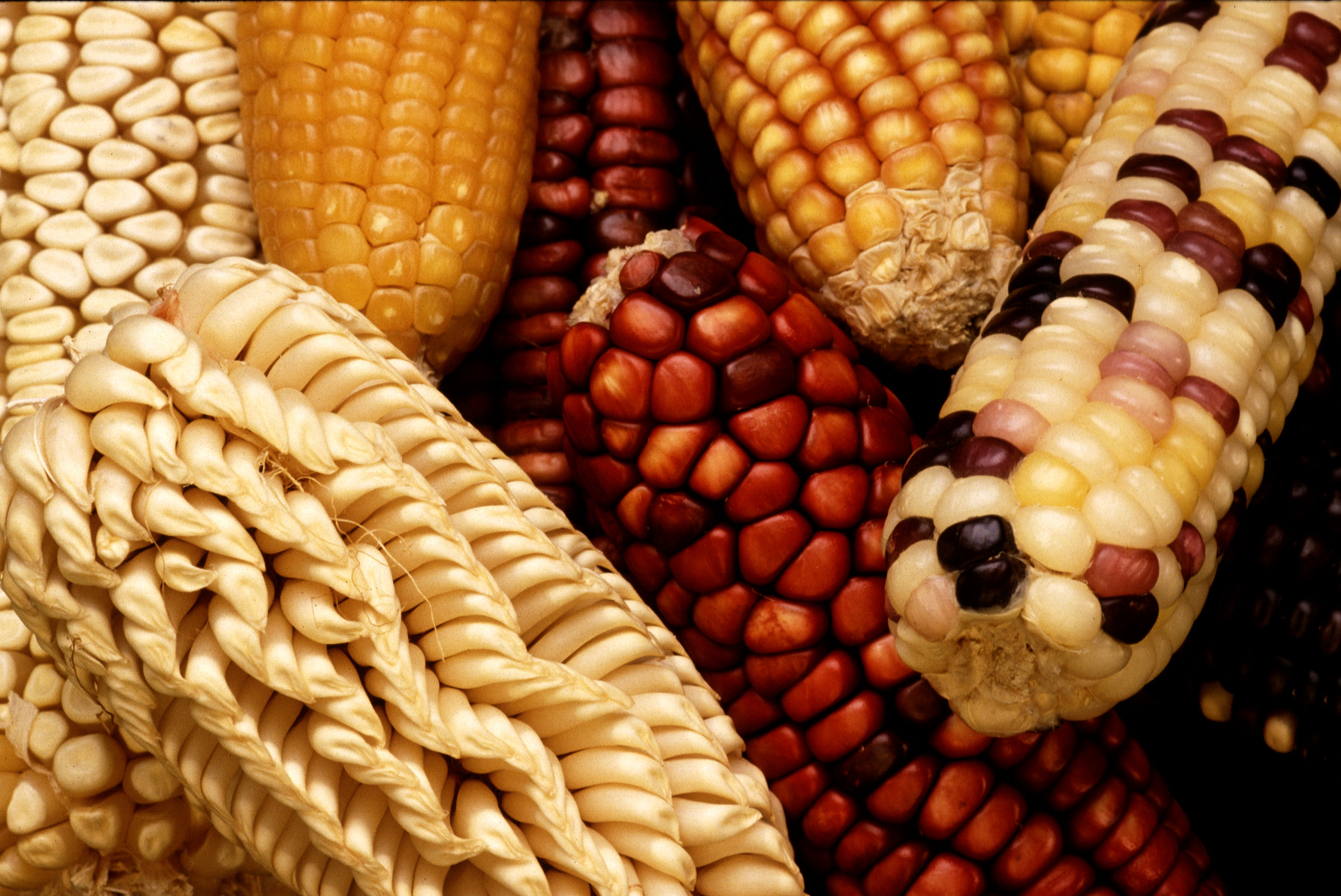
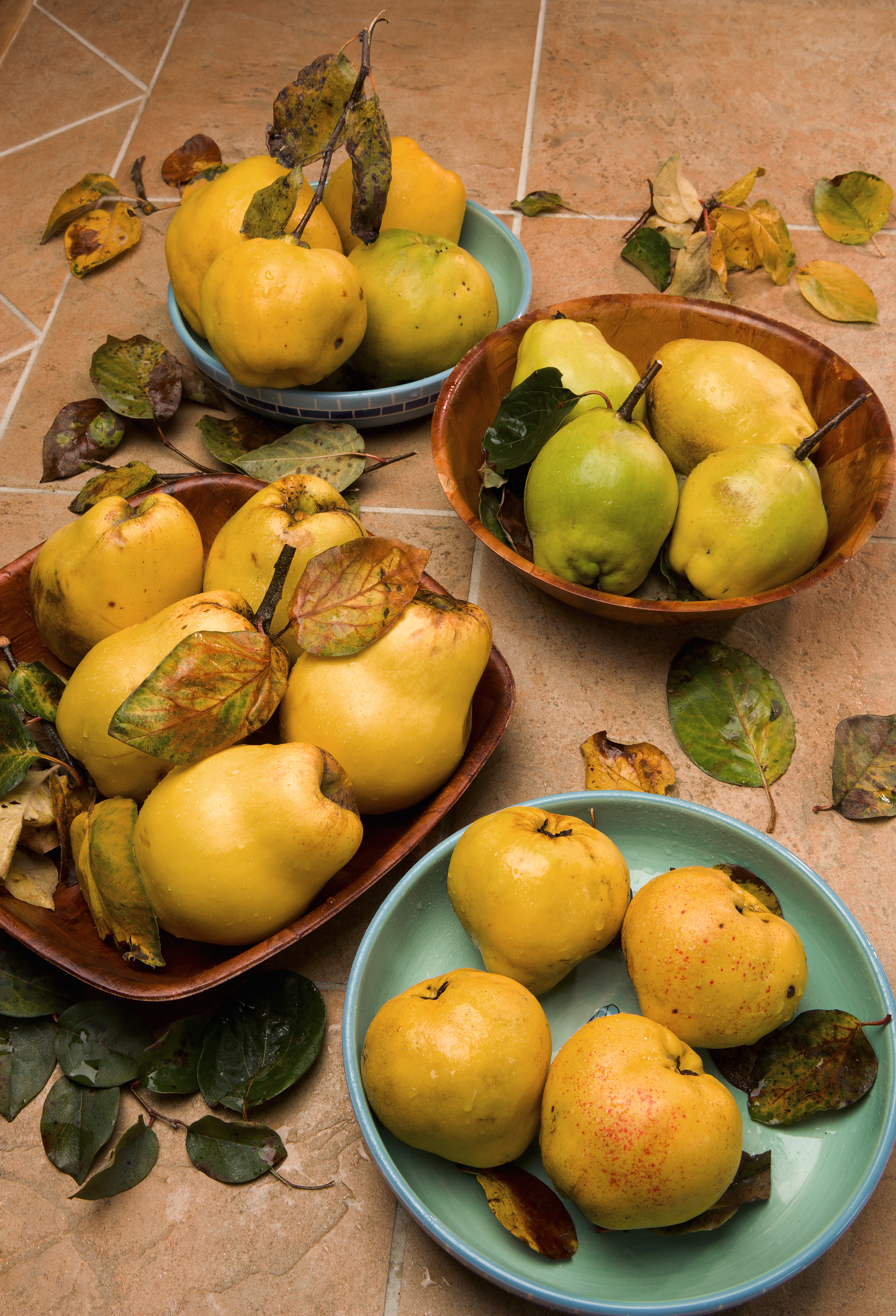
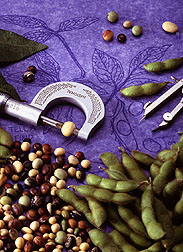
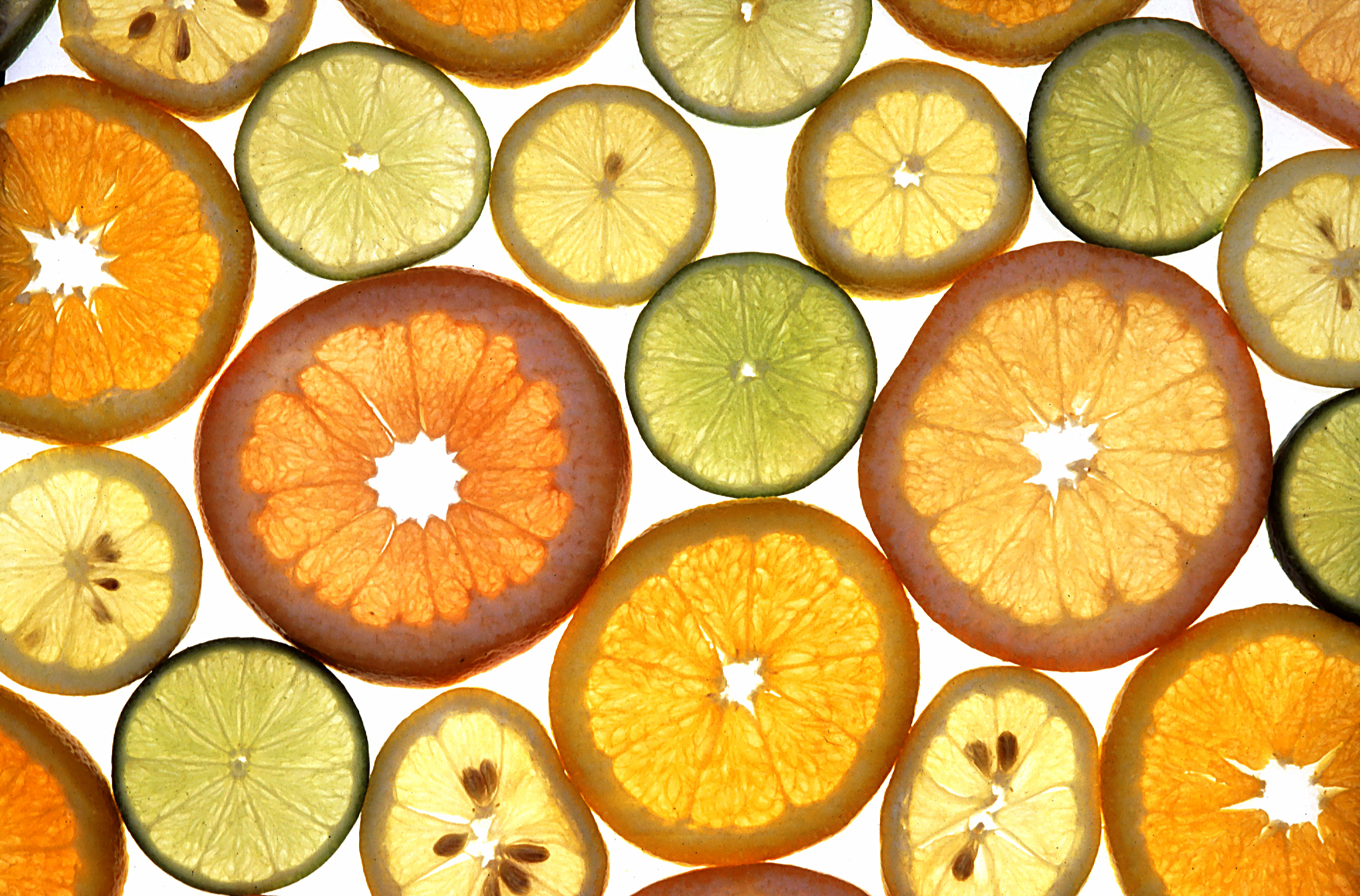
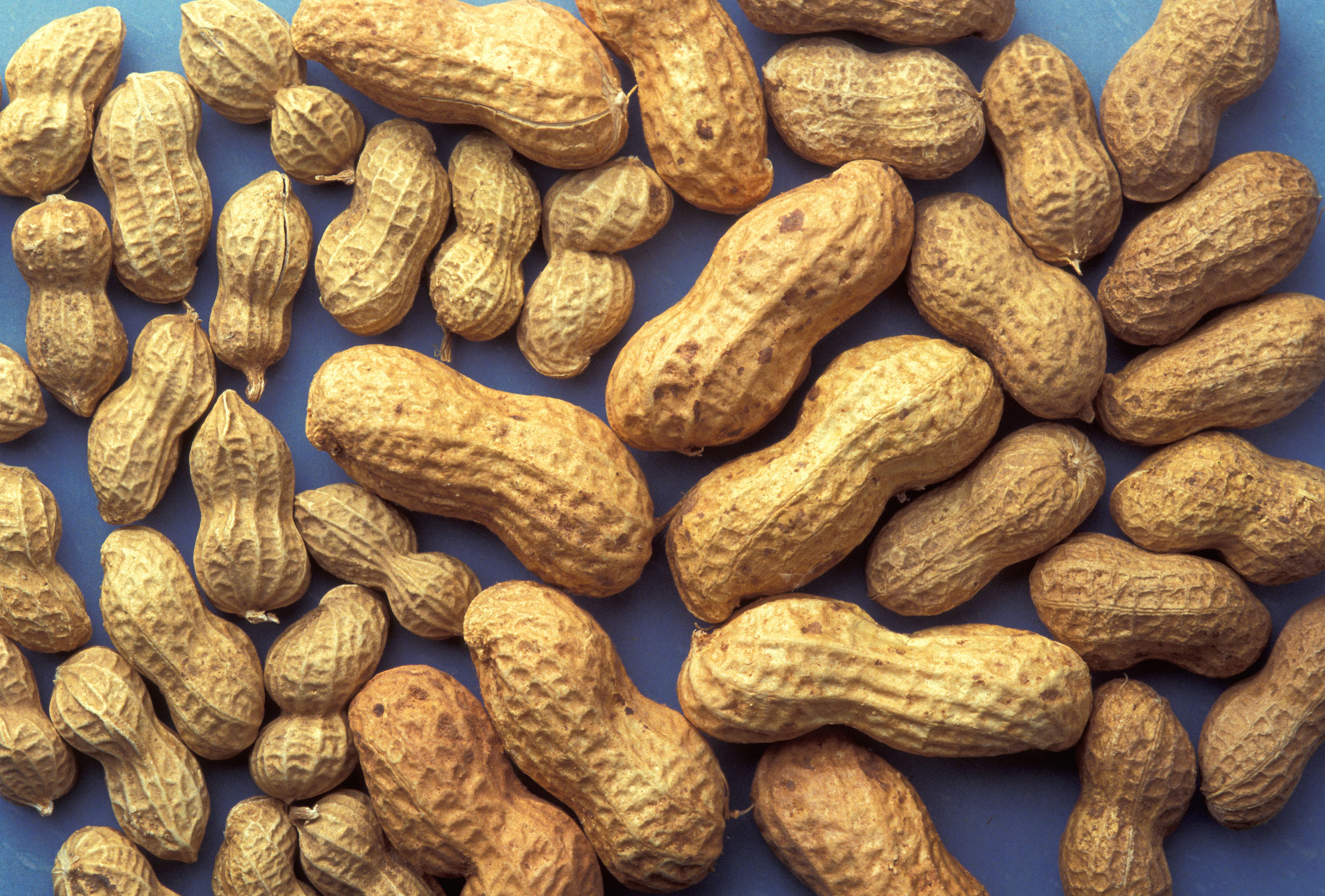
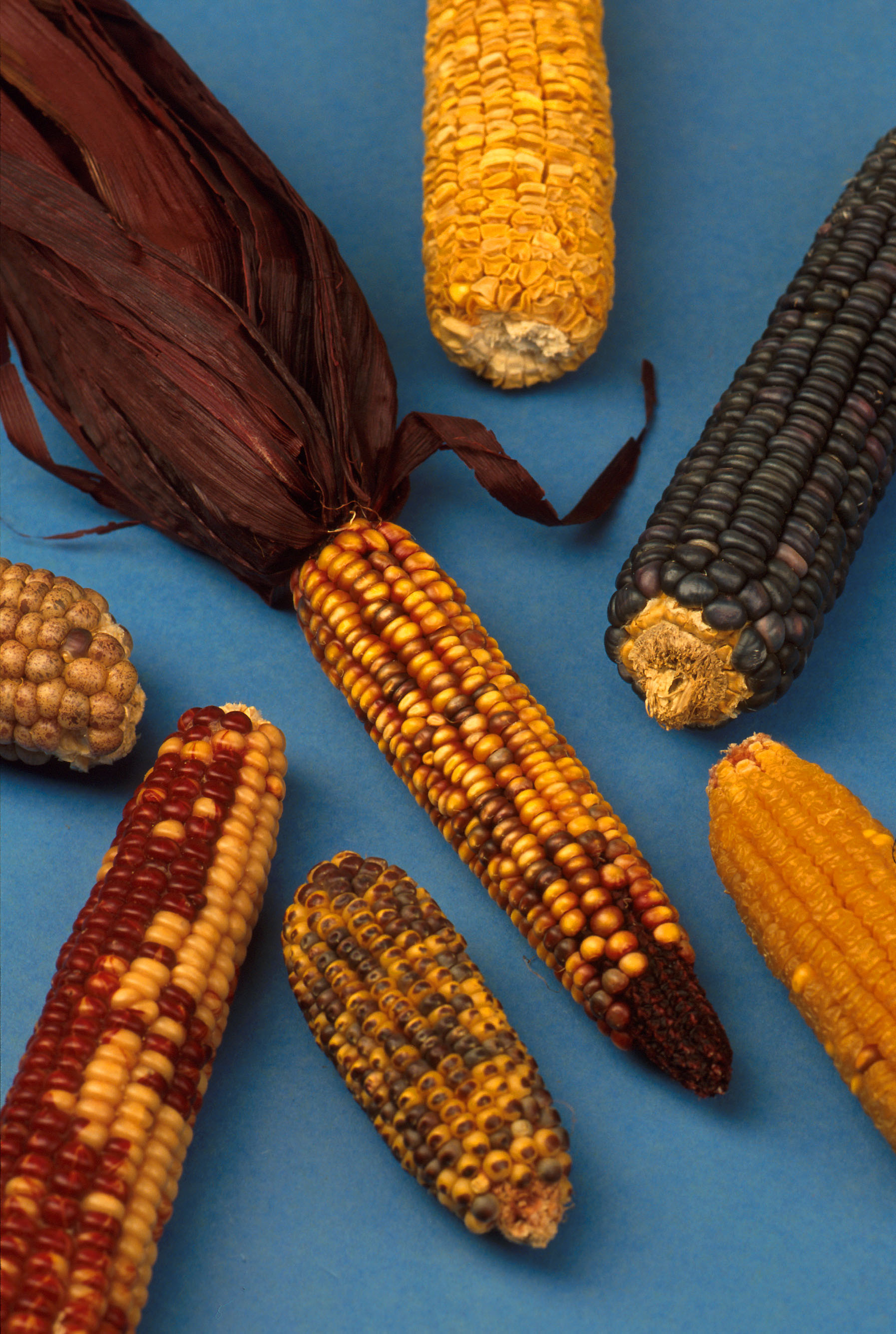
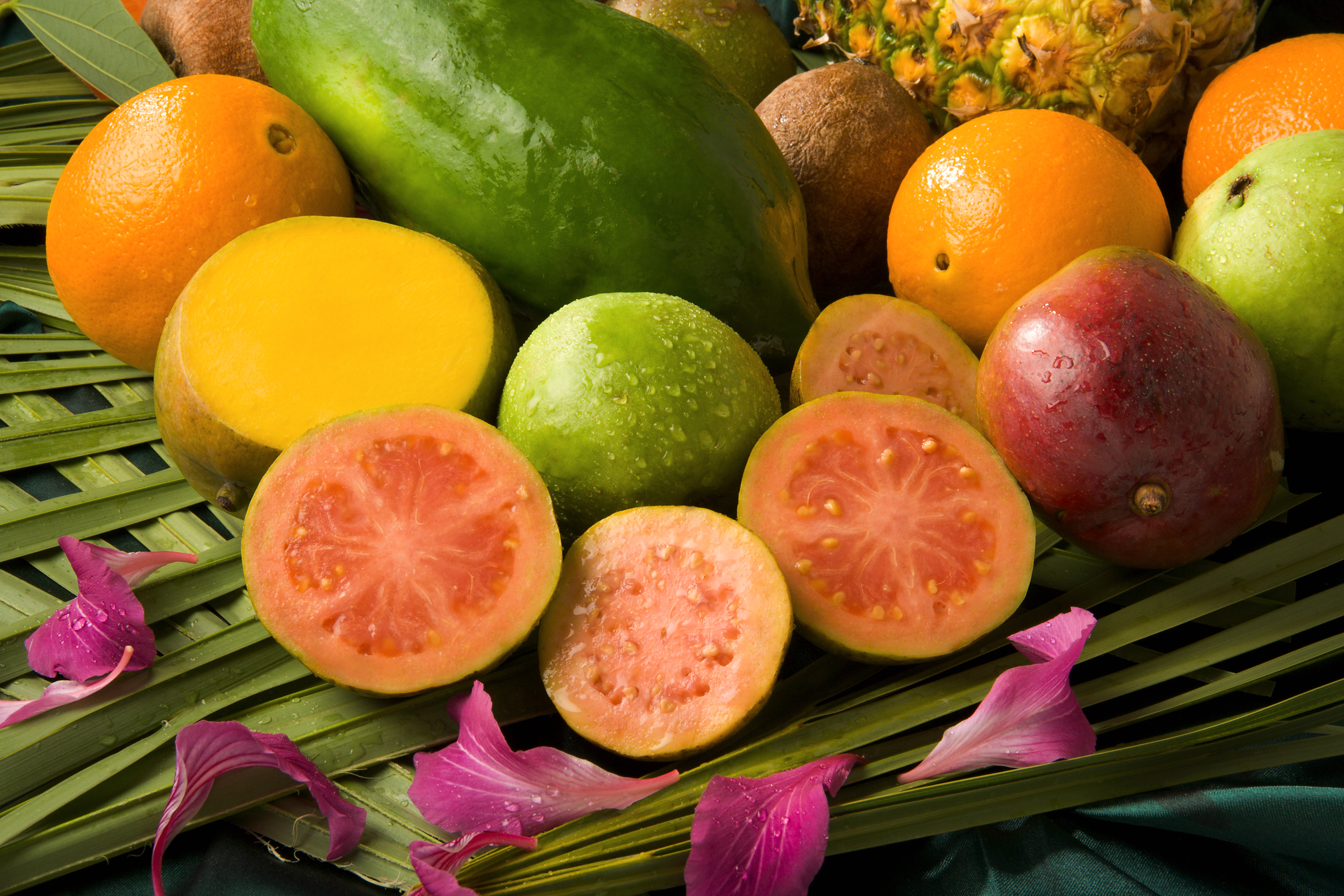
Colorful photo montage displaying different varieties of food crops from the USDA ARS Office of Communications.

The modern NPGS was formally established in 1974 following a restructuring of the USDA's Agricultural Research Service (ARS). The establishment of National Clonal Repositories began in the 1980s to preserve and manage clonally propagated crops—those that cannot be maintained as seed. The first repository was established in Corvallis, Oregon (1981), followed by Brawley, California (1981); Davis, California (1984); Geneva, New York (1986); Brownwood, Texas (1984); Hilo, Hawaii (1987); Orlando, Florida (1988); Miami, Florida (1984); Mayagüez, Puerto Rico (1984); and Riverside, California (1987). These repositories were purposefully located to accommodate the climatic needs of the crops they conserve, from temperate fruits to subtropical and tropical species.

More recent expansions of the NPGS include the establishment of the National Arid Land Plant Genetic Resources Unit in Parlier, California (1996), and the Ornamental Plant Germplasm Center in Columbus, Ohio (2001). With the creation of dedicated genebank sites across the country, the original Plant Introduction Gardens were gradually decommissioned. The Glen Dale, Maryland facility began phasing out in the 1990s, while the Savannah, Georgia location ceased to function as a Plant Introduction Station, with its germplasm collections transferred to other sites. Similarly, the clonal repository in Chico, California has closed, with materials redistributed to other appropriate locations.

The core components of the National Plant Germplasm System (NPGS) are its primary active collections located at 27 genebank sites across the United States. These collections are tasked with maintaining germplasm, characterizing and evaluating accessions, and producing viable seed or planting materials. They also serve as the primary sources for distributing plant genetic resources to plant breeders and scientists around the world in the public, private, and nongovernmental organization sectors. The active collections include those held at Regional Plant Introduction Stations, clonal germplasm repositories, and various commodity-specific or special-purpose collections. Each collection is strategically located in an environment best suited to the biological and environmental needs of the crops it curates, ensuring optimal conservation and regeneration conditions. Selected collections of the NPGS have been designated by the International Board for Plant Genetic Resources (IBPGR) as part of its international network of base collections.

The NPGS maintains over 620,000 active accessions representing more than 16,000 plant species, making it one of the world's largest and most diverse living plant collections. These include both seed-based crops, like wheat, and clonally maintained crops, like apples (2,664 accessions) and over 7,000 stone fruit trees. New germplasm continues to be added through the USDA's Plant Exploration Program, administered by the Plant Exchange Office at the National Germplasm Resources Laboratory (NGRL), as well as through donations from public and private sources. Long-term backup storage for these accessions is provided by the National Laboratory for Genetic Resources Preservation (NLGRP), formerly the National Seed Storage Laboratory (NSSL). The NLGRP was established to safeguard the nation's genetic resources in the event of catastrophic loss at primary genebank sites. In 1992, it underwent a major expansion with $12 million in federal funding, which quadrupled its storage capacity. It preserves seeds, clonal plant materials, and cryopreservation of animal germplasm and also coordinates the U.S. contribution to the Svalbard Global Seed Vault.

All NPGS collections are digitally linked through the Germplasm Resources Information Network (GRIN), a centralized information management system that consolidates plant inventory records. GRIN became publicly accessible online in 1994 and remains the core database for cataloging, requesting, and managing germplasm. Germplasm maintained by the NPGS is freely available upon request to researchers and plant breeders worldwide, without restrictions, provided the necessary import permits are secured. International distributions are accompanied by the Standard Material Transfer Agreement (SMTA) of the International Treaty on Plant Genetic Resources for Food and Agriculture, which outlines the terms and conditions for the use, conservation, and potential benefit-sharing of the genetic material.

The National Germplasm Resources Laboratory (NGRL), located in Beltsville, Maryland, is the successor to the original USDA Section of Seed and Plant Introduction. It manages the GRIN system and coordinates the work of 40 Crop Germplasm Committees (CGCs), composed of crop-specific experts who provide technical guidance to genebank curators regarding acquisition, maintenance, and evaluation priorities. The NPGS aligns its operations with the FAO Genebank Standards for Plant Genetic Resources for Food and Agriculture to uphold international best practices in genetic resource conservation.

The NPGS is primarily funded through U.S. federal appropriations to the Agricultural Research Service, supplemented by regional Capacity Funded projects (formerly known as Hatch funds). Its legal foundation was established under the U.S. National Genetic Resources Program, authorized by Congress in the 1990 Farm Bill. To further support national coordination of genetic resource policy and oversight, the National Genetic Resources Advisory Council (NGRAC) was formed in 2012 as a permanent subcommittee of the NAREEE Advisory Board.

In mid-February 2025, DOGE-led cuts to the USDA included employees of the NPGS. A court ordered the employees reinstated but they have not been allowed to resume their work.

USDA-ARS National Plant Germplasm System (NPGS)
Collection Name	Site	Location	Number of Accessions (2016)
National Germplasm Repository–Brownwood	BRW	Brownwood, TX	4,066
National Germplasm Repository–Corvallis	COR	Corvallis, OR	12,241
Cotton Collection	COT	College Station, TX	9,521
National Germplasm Repository–Davis	DAV	Davis, CA	8,719
Desert Legume Program	DLE	Vail, AZ	2,611
National Germplasm Repository–Geneva	GEN	Geneva, NY	7,468
Rice Genetic Stock Center	GSOR	Stuttgart, AR	36,678
Pea Genetic Stock Collection	GSPI	Pullman, WA	712
Maize Genetic Stock Center	GSZE	Urbana, IL	8,127
National Germplasm Repository–Hilo	HILO	Hilo, HI	783
National Germplasm Repository–Mayaguez	MAY	Mayaguez, PR	1,153
National Germplasm Repository–Miami	MIA	Miami, FL	3,273
National Arboretum	NA	Washington, DC	4,517
North Central Regional PI Station	NC7	Ames, IA	54,067
Northeast Regional PI Station	NE9	Geneva, NY	12,624
Potato Germplasm Introduction Station	NR6	Sturgeon Bay, WI	5,931
National Small Grains Collection	NSGC	Aberdeen, ID	143,287
National Laboratory for Genetic Resources Preservation	NSSL	Fort Collins, CO	12,660
Forest Service National Seed Laboratory	NTSL	Dry Branch, GA	7,600
Ornamental Plant Germplasm Center	OPGC	Columbus, OH	5,050
National Arid Land Plant Genetic Resources Unit	PARL	Parlier, CA	1,494
Plant Germplasm Quarantine Program	PGQP	Beltsville, MD	951
Plant Variety Protection Voucher Collection	PVPO	Fort Collins, CO	7,502
National Germplasm Repository–Riverside	RIV	Riverside, CA	1,789
Plant Genetic Resources Conservation Unit	S9	Griffin, GA	99,151
Soybean Collection	SOY	Urbana, IL	22,143
C.M. Rick Tomato Genetics Resource Center	TGRC	Davis, CA	3,716
US Nicotiana Germplasm Collection	TOB	Oxford, NC	2,229
Western Regional PI Station	W6	Pullman, WA	96,262

== See also ==
- United States Department of Agriculture
- Agricultural Research Service
- Germplasm Resources Information Network
- National Clonal Germplasm Repository
- National Animal Germplasm Program
- Office of Seed and Plant Introduction
