= Office of Seed and Plant Introduction =

The Section of Seed and Plant Introduction was the first official branch of the United States Department of Agriculture responsible for collecting and introducing new plant species and varieties to the United States. It was established in 1898, under the direction of David Fairchild and employed agricultural explorers to seek out economically useful plants to introduce to the United States from all over the world. It has introduced over 200,000 species and varieties of non-native plants to the United States including some of the most well-known and economically significant crops. The activities of the Section of Seed and Plant Introduction and its early successors were largely responsible for the industrialization of agriculture in the United States. Since the establishment of the Section of Seed and Plant Introduction there has continuously been an office within the USDA with plant exploration and collection responsibility, though its name has changed periodically. Today, the mission area within USDA responsible for collecting, conserving, documenting, and distributing plant material is called the National Plant Germplasm System.

== Formation and purpose ==
The importance of seed and plant introduction and seed distribution was widely recognized well before the establishment of the Section of Seed and Plant Introduction. Farmers and economists alike saw the need for new varieties of crops as the United States developed. Particular attention was paid to plants that could provide food throughout the year and those that could be used in crop rotation to fertilize the soil.

In 1862, President Abraham Lincoln established the United States Department of Agriculture, and tasked its first Commissioner, Isaac Newton, to collect new plant species, test their economic value, and introduce them to American farmers. Thus, in 1898, the Section of Seed and Plant Introduction was created with an initial budget of $20,000. Its goal was to explore the world for new and useful plant species, test their economic utility through cultivation, and market those species to US farmers. The duties of this office included world-wide plant expeditions, crop testing (to ensure no diseases or invasive pests were introduced), propagation, and distribution. The office oversaw several testing gardens, including the USDA Plant Introduction Garden in Miami Florida and the National Seed Distribution program.

== The explorers ==
The Section of Seed and Plant Introduction sent "explorers" to every continent in search of new plants. These individuals were typically plant scientists and plant pathologists. In addition to seeking out new plant species from around the world, these men were tasked with cultivating species at home, administrative tasks within the department, and marketing the news plants to farmers in the United States. Their expeditions were well-documented in a news series called "Uncle Sam’s Plant Hunters" which helped them introduce the new plants to consumers.

=== Notable explorers ===
- David Fairchild was appointed the head of the office at its inception and was fundamentally involved in the office for 27 years. He traveled to every continent except Antarctica. Between himself and those working directly under him, he introduced over 80,000 species of plants to the United States.
- Frank N. Meyer is well recognized for the number of plants he introduced as well as the hardships he endured in his explorations. The "Meyer Lemon" is a popular variety of lemon named after him.
- O.F. Cook is credited with inventing the system for plant cataloguing we still use today. Plant Introduction or P.I. numbers are assigned to all new plant species so they can be easily referenced.
- Mark Carleton traveled to Russia in search of hardier crop varieties. He is responsible for introducing durum wheat, one of the most common modern wheat species. Just five years after its introduction the United States produced 20,000,000 bushels. His contributions alone accounted for almost a third of the U.S. crop in 1939.
