= William Joseph Morse =

American botanist (1884–1959)

- Born: May 10, 1884; Lowville, New York
- Died: July 30, 1959 (aged 75); Eastchester, New York
- Citizenship: American
- Education: Cornell University
- Known for: Soybean
- Scientific career
- Fields: Botany
- Workplaces: United States Department of Agriculture (USDA)

William Joseph Morse (May 10, 1884–1959 July 30) was an American botanist and agriculturalist employed by the United States Department of Agriculture (USDA).

== Early life and education ==
William Joseph Morse was born on May 10, 1884, in Lowville, New York. He was the son of John Baptist Morse (a butcher shop owner) and Lena Kirschner. He attended Lowville Academy (high school). He was a good athlete, and he played on the football team. Morse gained a BS in agriculture (BSA) degree from Cornell University in 1907.

== Career ==
Two days after graduation, in June 1907, he joined the USDA in the Division of Forage Crops and Diseases, within the Bureau of Plant Industry. It was just at the time that the Bureau was planning to expand its research on the growing of soybeans. At the Bureau, Morse, then 24 years old, was assigned to work under Dr. Charles Vancouver Piper, who was head of the USDA's Office of Forage Crops., and he was to have an immense influence on the rest of Morse's life. Morse subsequently became a soybean specialist, and an agricultural explorer, under Dr. Piper's guides and vision.

Morse's agricultural exploration work culminated in the 1928–1931 "Dorsett-Morse Oriental Agricultural Exploration Expedition" to East Asia, especially Manchuria, China, and with Palemon Howard Dorsett. Their trip report fills 17 volumes and contains more than 8,818 pages plus about 3,200 glossy black-and-white photo prints, is now at the USDA National Agricultural Library (Beltsville, Maryland), in the Rare and Special Collections.

On December 6, 1923, Morse was elected president of the American Soybean Association (ASA) for one year (1923–24) at the annual winter meeting in Chicago, Illinois. He was also elected chair of the "Soybean nomenclature" committee, and chair of the subcommittee on soybean variety registration. He was elected president again in 1925 and in 1931. He was a mainstay of support of the ASA from 1920 until his retirement from USDA in 1949.

William Joseph Morse is considered the "father" of modern soybean agriculture in America. In 1910, he and Charles Piper began to popularize what was regarded as a relatively unknown Oriental peasant crop in America into a "golden bean", with the soybean becoming one of America's largest and most nutritious farm crops.

== Later life and legacy ==
Following his retirement, Morse and his wife settled in Eastchester, New York, where they lived next door to his daughter, Margaret, and her family, where he wrote and grew green vegetable soybeans as a hobby. Morse died on July 30, 1959, at his home in Eastchester at the age of 75. He has been referred to as having "better claim than any other man to the title of founder of the soybean industry in the U.S." (Agronomy Journal, obituary). In 1958, one year prior to his death, United States soybean production exceeded 500 million bushels for the first time in history.

Although practically unseen in 1900, by 2000 soybean plantings covered more than 70 million acres, second only to corn, and it became America's largest cash crop. In 2021, 87,195,000 acres were planted, with the largest acreage in the states of Illinois, Iowa, and Minnesota.

== Works ==
In 1923, Charles Piper wrote, with Morse, The Soybean, a thorough and now classic monograph of the species. The botanists were instrumental in establishing this plant as a successful crop in the U.S. It became a fundamental part of U.S. agriculture. Since the 1970s, it has been the second largest and most valuable crop in the United States after corn – and ahead of wheat.

== See also ==
- Charles Vancouver Piper
- Palemon Howard Dorsett
- Frank Nicholas Meyer
- Walter Tennyson Swingle
