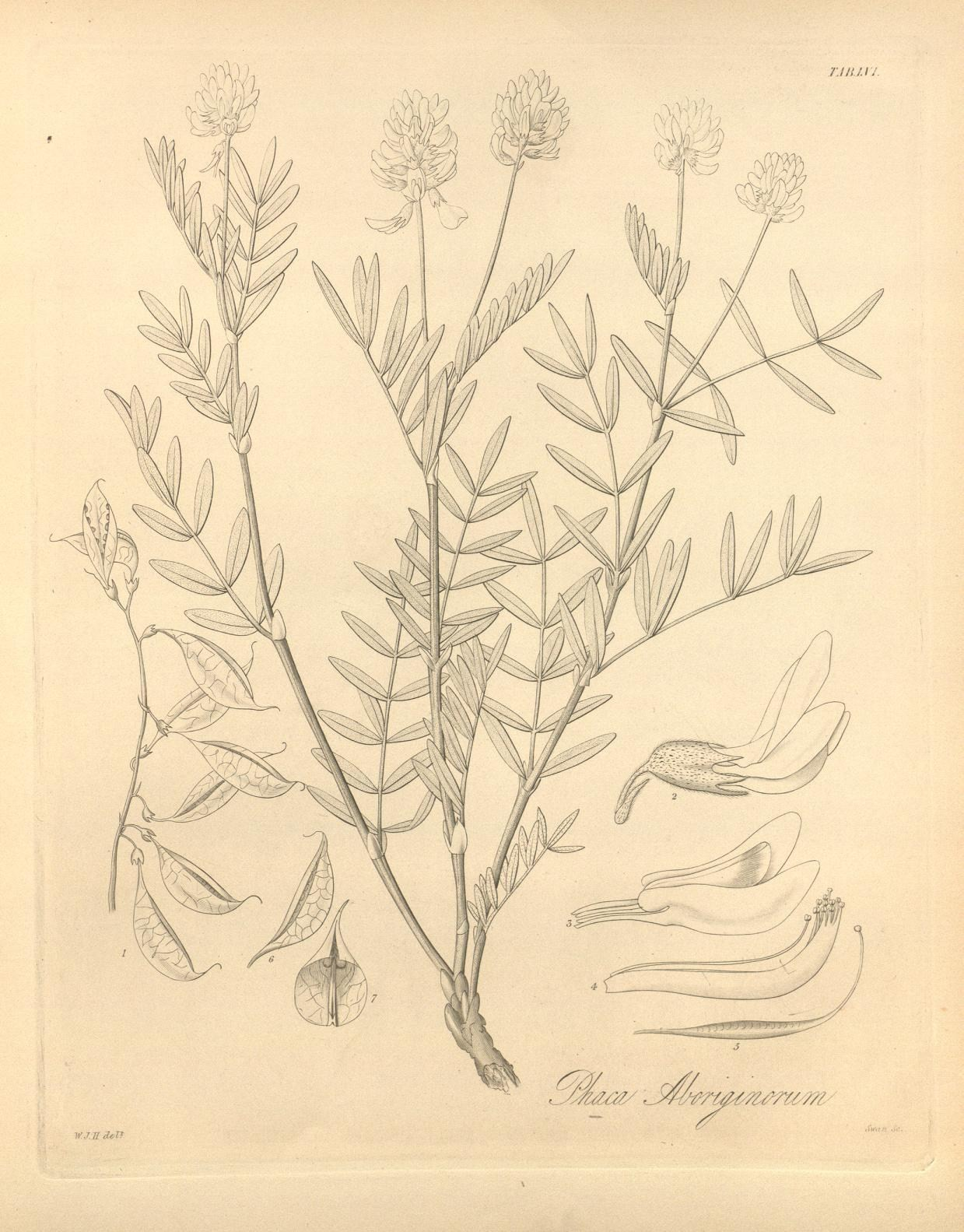

Scientific classification
- Kingdom: Plantae
- Clade: Tracheophytes
- Clade: Angiosperms
- Clade: Eudicots
- Clade: Rosids
- Order: Fabales
- Family: Fabaceae
- Subfamily: Faboideae
- Genus: Astragalus
- Species: A. aboriginorum

Binomial name
- Astragalus aboriginorum Richardson

Synonyms
- List: Astragalus aboriginorum var. glabriusculus (Hook.) Rydb. (1890); Astragalus aboriginorum var. muriei Hultén (1947); Astragalus australis var. aboriginorum (Richardson) S.L.Welsh (1998); Astragalus australis var. glabriusculus (Hook.) Isely (1984); Astragalus australis var. major (A.Gray) Isely (1983); Astragalus australis var. muriei (Hultén) S.L.Welsh (1998); Astragalus australis var. olympicus Isely (1983); Astragalus forwoodii S.Watson (1890); Astragalus forwoodii var. wallowensis (Rydb.) M.Peck (1941); Astragalus glabriusculus (Hook.) A.Gray (1864); Astragalus glabriusculus var. major A.Gray (1863); Astragalus glabriusculus var. spatiosus (A.Heller) E.Sheld. (1894); Astragalus linearis (Rydb.) A.E.Porsild (1939); Astragalus olympicus J.S.Cotton (1902); Astragalus scrupulicola Fernald & Weath. (1931); Atelophragma aboriginum (Richardson) Rydb. (1905); Atelophragma forwoodii (S.Watson) Rydb. (1913); Atelophragma glabriusculum (Hook.) Rydb. (1905); Atelophragma herriotii Rydb. (1928); Atelophragma lineare Rydb. (1913); Atelophragma wallowense Rydb. (1928); Homalobus aboriginorum (Richardson) Rydb. (1900); Homalobus glabriusculus (Hook.) Rydb. (1900); Homalobus spatiosus A.Heller (1900); Phaca aboriginorum (Richardson) Hook. (1831); Phaca aboriginum Hook. ex S.Watson (1878); Phaca glabriuscula Hook. (1831); Tragacantha aboriginorum (Richardson) Kuntze (1891); Tragacantha glabriuscula (Hook.) Kuntze (1891)

= Astragalus aboriginorum =

Species of flowering plant in the pea family

Astragalus aboriginorum is a species of flowering plant in the family Fabaceae. Its name is also spelt Astragalus aboriginum. It is native from subarctic America through Western Canada to the west and central United States, and to Quebec.

== Taxonomy ==
The species was first described by John Richardson in 1823 as Astragalus aboriginorum. In 1827, Sprengel changed the spelling of Richardson's epithet to aboriginum. The genitive plural of the Latin word aborigines is aboriginum, not aboriginorum. Sources differ on whether they consider Sprengel's change justified under the International Code of Nomenclature for algae, fungi, and plants; as of October 2023, Plants of the World Online has aboriginorum, whereas the International Plant Names Index has entries for both Astragalus aboriginum and Astragalus aboriginorum.
