= Byron Halsted =

American botanist and plant pathologist

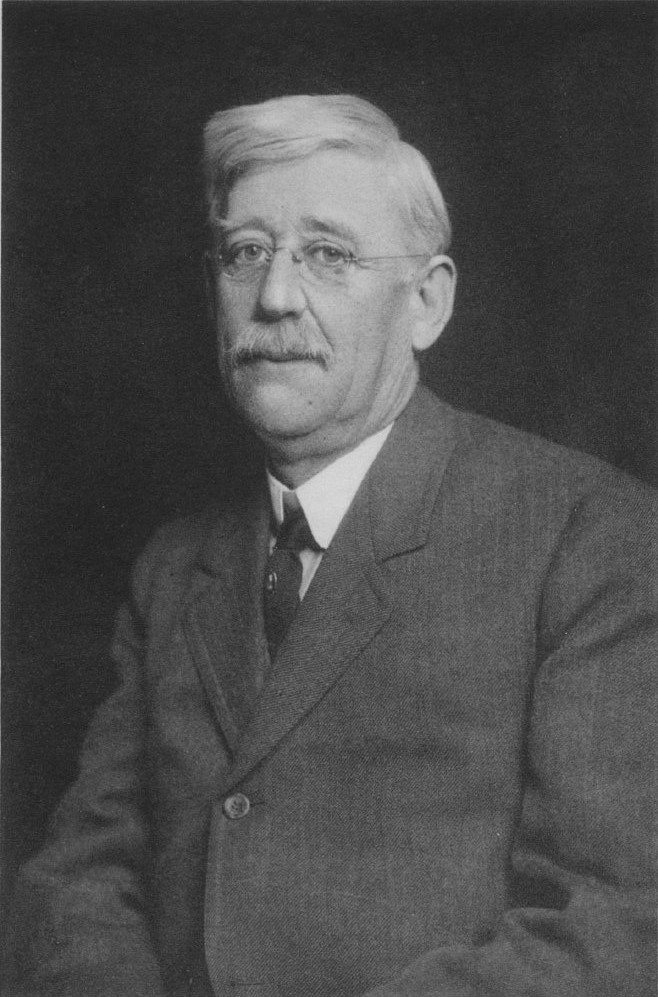

Byron David Halsted (June 7, 1852 – August 28, 1918) was an American botanist and plant pathologist.

Halsted was born at Venice, New York. He studied at Michigan State University and at Harvard (D.Sc., 1879).

In 1885, he began teaching botany at Iowa State and in 1889, he moved on to Rutgers in New Jersey.

In addition to his writings on biology and agriculture, Halsted was known for his book, Barn Plans and Outbuildings (New York: Orange Judd Co., 1894).

Halsted was an uncle of plant explorer David Fairchild who studied with him in Iowa and New Jersey.

The standard author abbreviation Halst. is used to indicate this person as the author when citing a botanical name.'
