= Daniel Stone (author) =

American journalist and author

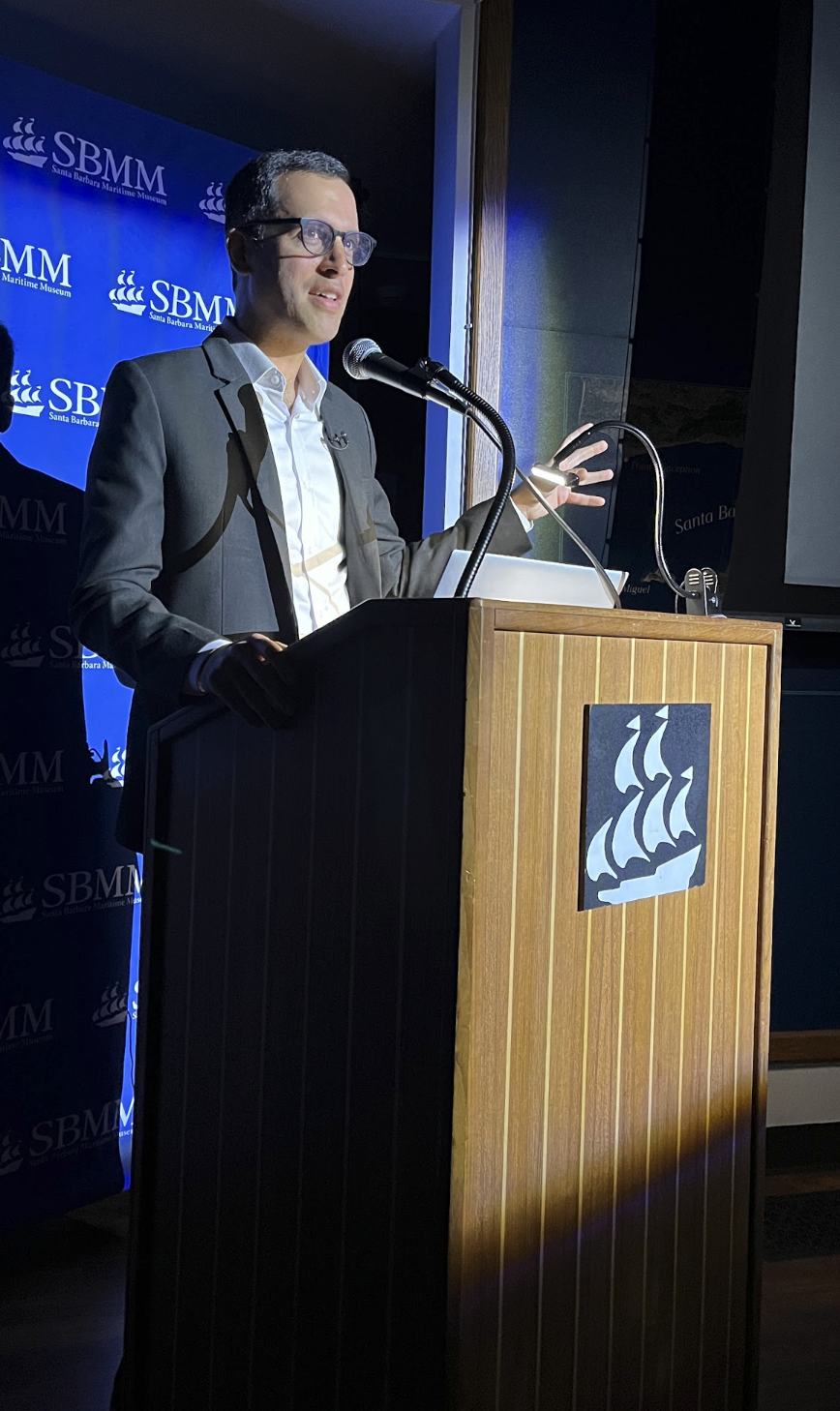
- Daniel Stone at the Santa Barbara Maritime Museum in 2023.
- Education: University of California, Davis; Johns Hopkins University
- Occupations: Journalist, historian, author

Daniel Stone is an American historian and author of adventure and science books. He was a senior editor for National Geographic and a White House correspondent for Newsweek. His books include The Food Explorer (2018), Sinkable (2022), and American Poison (2025), and has a upcoming book Stealing George Washington releasing in February 2027.In 2024 he was named the Arthur Molella Distinguished Fellow by the Smithsonian's National Museum of American History.

== Career ==
In 2007, Stone was as a production writer for America's Most Wanted. He later wrote for Newsweek and The Daily Beast, covering energy and environmental policy, and was Newsweek's White House correspondent from 2009 to 2012. From 2012 to 2021, he was a senior editor for National Geographic Magazine.

In 2018, Stone published his first book, The Food Explorer: The True Adventures of the Globe-Trotting Botanist Who Transformed What America Eats, about botanist and plant explorer David Fairchild. His second book, Sinkable: Obsession, the Deep Sea, and the Shipwreck of the Titanic, was published in 2022. In 2025, he published American Poison: A Deadly Invention and the Woman Who Battled for Environmental Justice about Alice Hamilton and her dispute with Ethyl Corporation over leaded gasoline and it's inventor Thomas Midgley.

Stone is a lecturer in environmental science at Johns Hopkins University. In 2024, he was named a Distinguished Fellow with the Smithsonian's National Museum of American History.
