= National Animal Germplasm Program =

Program of US department of Agriculture

The National Animal Germplasm Program, or NAGP, is a program of the United States Department of Agriculture that captures and cryogenically preserves germplasm from plants and animals it considers important to agriculture for the purpose of preserving biodiversity and to provide economic benefits to the agriculture industry. Germplasm consists of semen, embryos, and other tissues that contain genetic information. The online Germplasm Resources Information Network contains information from the NAGP, along with related projects such as the USDA's National Plant Germplasm System.
