= American Soybean Association =

- Abbreviation: ASA
- Formation: 1920; 106 years ago
- Purpose: To advocate for U.S. soy farmers on policy and trade.
- Location: United States
- Official language: English
- President: Caleb Ragland
- Website: soygrowers.com

The American Soybean Association (ASA) is an association of 21,000 American soybean producers. John Heisdorffer is the 2018 President of the Association. Stephen Censky worked for ASA for 23 years, 21 of those as CEO, and then left to become United States Deputy Secretary of Agriculture in 2017. (Note: p. 7, "We can't...") Censky was then reappointed as CEO of the Association in November, 2020 following his service at USDA.

ASA's goals include policy development and implementation. It organizes an annual meeting of voting delegates, where policy goals are set. The ASA has testified before Congress, and lobbies both the legislative and executive branches of the federal government.

== Policy positions ==
The ASA is generally in favor of allowing new GM soy varieties. It especially supports separate regulation of transgenics and all other techniques. (Note: p. 8, USDA's withdrawal...) (Note: p. 15, "The U.S. Department...") It generally takes an optimistic view of GM soy and believes it will improve future yields and nutrition qualities. (Note: p. 4, "Breakthrough Research Could Save Farmers Millions")

Representing both users of dicamba and some of the victims of dicamba drift - and recognizing that one important invisible asset for soybean growers is their relationship with their neighbors - the ASA has supported and funded research into the causes and remedies of dicamba drift. Continued availability of dicamba is especially important as it is used where herbicide resistance has sprung up against other herbicides, and yet neighboring soy fields must not be damaged, nor any other neighboring crops or people. A large number of universities across the US are participating. The ASA has even shown willingness to support further restrictions on use of dicamba so as to keep it available in the future.

== See also ==
- William Joseph Morse
