= Palemon Howard Dorsett =

American botanist (1862–1943)

- Born: April 21, 1862; Carlinville, Macoupin County, Illinois
- Died: April 1, 1943 (aged 80); Washington, D. C.
- Citizenship: American
- Education: University of Missouri
- Awards: the 13th Frank N. Meyer Medal 1936
- Scientific career
- Fields: Botany
- Workplaces: United States Department of Agriculture (USDA)

Palemon Howard Dorsett (1862–1943) was an American horticulturalist employed by the United States Department of Agriculture (USDA).

== Early life and education ==
Dorsett was born on April 21, 1862, in Carlinville, Macoupin County, Illinois. He gained a BA from the University of Missouri in 1884, and joined the USDA Section of Plant Pathology seven years later.

== Career ==
He left the USDA in 1907 to found his own horticultural business in Alexandria, Virginia, but rejoined the Department in 1909. In 1913 Dorsett began his first foreign expedition, to Brazil, with Archibald Dixon Shamel and Wilson Popenoe. Later expeditions took him to Panama, Manchuria, Ceylon (Sri Lanka).

=== Soy research ===
His trip to East Asia in 1924-1927 with his son, James H. Dorsett, was his most important in terms of soybean germplasm collected. His agricultural exploration work culminated in the 1928-1931 "Dorsett-Morse Oriental Agricultural Exploration Expedition" to Japan, Korea, and China, with William Joseph Morse, a soybean specialist of USDA's Office of Forage Crops.

Returning to the US in 1932, he retired from the USDA, but joined the Allison Vincent Armour agricultural expedition to the British West Indies and Guianas the same year. In 1936 he was awarded the 13th Frank N. Meyer Medal by the Council of the American Genetic Association for "distinguished actions related to the collection, preservation, or utilization of germplasm resources".

Dorsett died aged 80 in a Washington, D. C. nursing home on April 1, 1943. In contrast to his illustrious career, his private life had been blighted by the premature deaths of his wife Mary Virginia (née Payne) and two of his daughters. His only son, James, with whom he travelled to China in 1924-25, died on 8 Oct. 1927 of tuberculosis.

== Publications ==
- Dorsett, P. H. 1898?. The selection of violets. Washington, D.C.
- Dorsett, P. H., and A. F. Woods. 1908. The Use of Hydrocyanic Acid Gas for Fumigating Greenhouses and Cold Frames, USDA Division of Entomology Circular No. 37. United States Department of Agriculture, Bureau of Entomology. (co-author A. F. Woods, revised 1903 and 1908)
- Dorsett, P. H. 1900. Spot disease of the violet (Alternaria violæ n. sp.). USDA Division of Vegetable Physiology and Pathology Bulletin, No. 23.
- Dorsett, P. H. 1913. Experiments in bulb growing at the United States bulb garden at Bellingham. 'USDA Bulletin No. 28. US Dept. of Agriculture.
- Dorsett, P. H., Shamel, A. D., & Popenoe, W. 1917. The navel orange of Bahia: with notes on some little-known Brazilian fruits. Bulletin No. 445. US Dept. of Agriculture.
- Dorsett, P. H. 1917. The plant-introduction gardens of the Department of Agriculture. In Yearbook of Agriculture 1916 (pp. 135-144). Washington, D.C.: US Department of Agriculture.
- Dorsett, P. H., and Dorsett, J. H. 1928. Culture and outdoor winter storage of persimmons in the vicinity of Peking, China. USDA Circular No. 49. United States Department of Agriculture.

== Eponymy ==
Ulmus macrocarpa var. dorsettii

== See also ==
- William Joseph Morse
