= National Clonal Germplasm Repository =

The National Clonal Germplasm Repository is a branch of the Agricultural Research Service research agency of the United States Department of Agriculture (USDA). The Repository is a gene bank that preserves genetic resources by various means, including cryopreservation.

There are nine clonal repositories located in appropriate locations throughout the United States.

Citrus and dates are preserved in Riverside, California,

Temperate grapes, temperate fruit, olives, walnut, almond and pistachio nuts are located in Davis, California,

Temperate small fruit, berries, pears, hazelnut, butternut and specialty crops are located in Corvallis, Oregon. Apples, cold-hardy grapes, and tart cherries are in Geneva, New York.

Tropical fruit such as papaya, guava, pineapple and passionfruit are in Hilo, Hawaii

Tropical fruits such as mango, avocado, banana, tropical citrus as well as sugar cane are held in Miami, FL and Mayagüez, PR.

The base gene bank for the USDA National Germplasm System is the National Center for Germplasm Preservation at Ft. Collins, CO. This center holds seeds of agronomic crops, cryopreserved clonal plant materials, animal, and bacterial germplasm.

== See also ==
- Germplasm Resources Information Network
