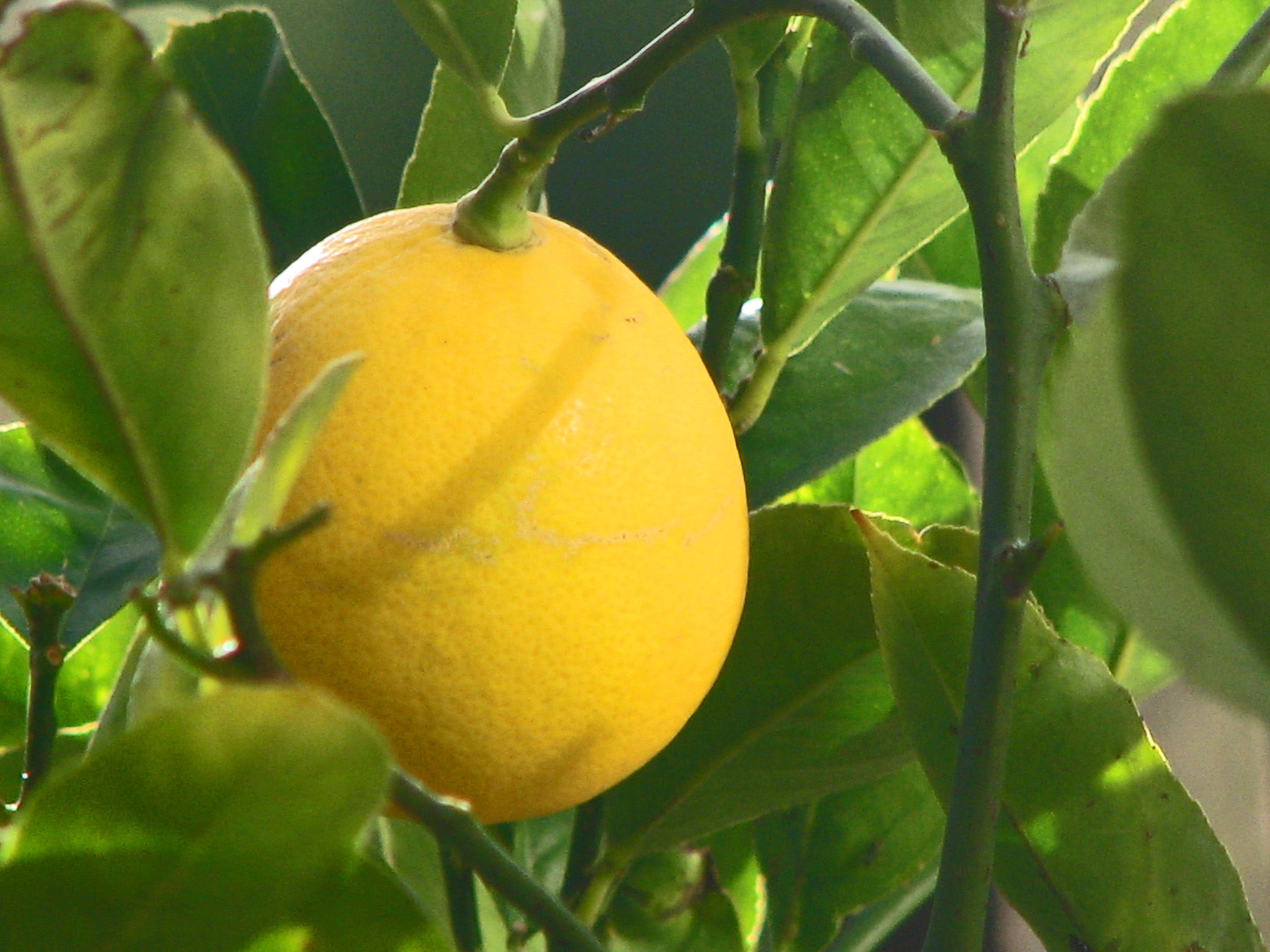

Scientific classification
- Kingdom: Plantae
- Clade: Embryophytes
- Clade: Tracheophytes
- Clade: Spermatophytes
- Clade: Angiosperms
- Clade: Eudicots
- Clade: Rosids
- Order: Sapindales
- Family: Rutaceae
- Genus: Citrus
- Species: C. × meyeri

Binomial name
- Citrus × meyeri Yu.Tanaka

= Meyer lemon =

Citrus fruit

Citrus × meyeri, the Meyer lemon (Chinese: 北京檸檬; pinyin: beijing níngméng), is a hybrid citrus fruit native to China. It is a cross between a citron and a mandarin/pomelo hybrid.

Mature trees are around 6 to 10 ft (2 to 3 m) tall with dark green shiny leaves. The flowers are white with a purple base and are fragrant. The fruit is rounder than a true lemon, deep yellow with a slight orange tint when ripe, and has a sweeter, less acidic flavor.

It was introduced to the United States in 1908 as S.P.I. #23028 by the agricultural explorer Frank Nicholas Meyer, an employee of the United States Department of Agriculture who collected a sample of the plant on a trip to China. Though it is given his name, this variety was likely established thousands of years before he introduced it to America.

The Meyer lemon is commonly grown in China in garden pots as an ornamental tree. It became popular as a food item in the United States after being rediscovered by chefs such as Alice Waters at Chez Panisse during the rise of California cuisine starting in the 1970s. Popularity further climbed when Martha Stewart began featuring them in some of her recipes.

== Description ==
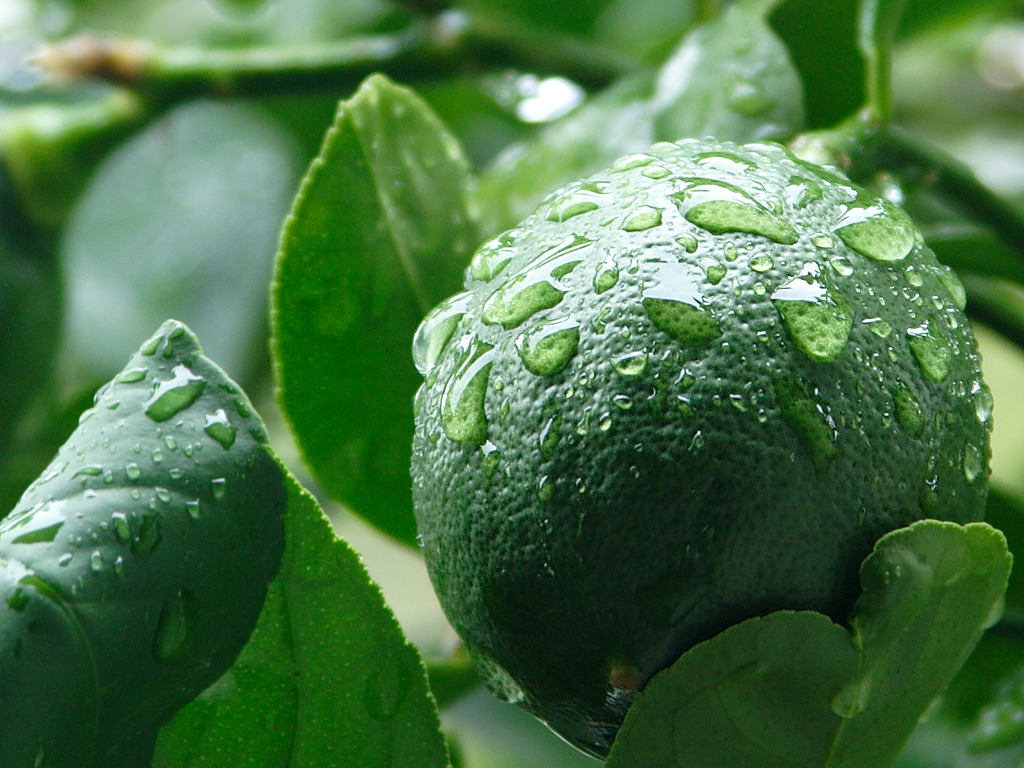
An unripened Meyer lemon

Citrus × meyeri trees are around 6 to 10 ft (2 to 3 m) tall at maturity, though they can be pruned smaller. Their leaves are dark green and shiny. The flowers are white with a purple base and are fragrant.

The Meyer lemon fruit is yellow and rounder than a true lemon. The skin is fragrant and thin, colored a deep yellow with a slight orange tint when ripe. Meyer lemon fruits have a sweeter, less acidic flavor than the more common Lisbon or Eureka supermarket lemon varieties. The pulp is a dark yellow and contains up to 10 seeds per fruit.

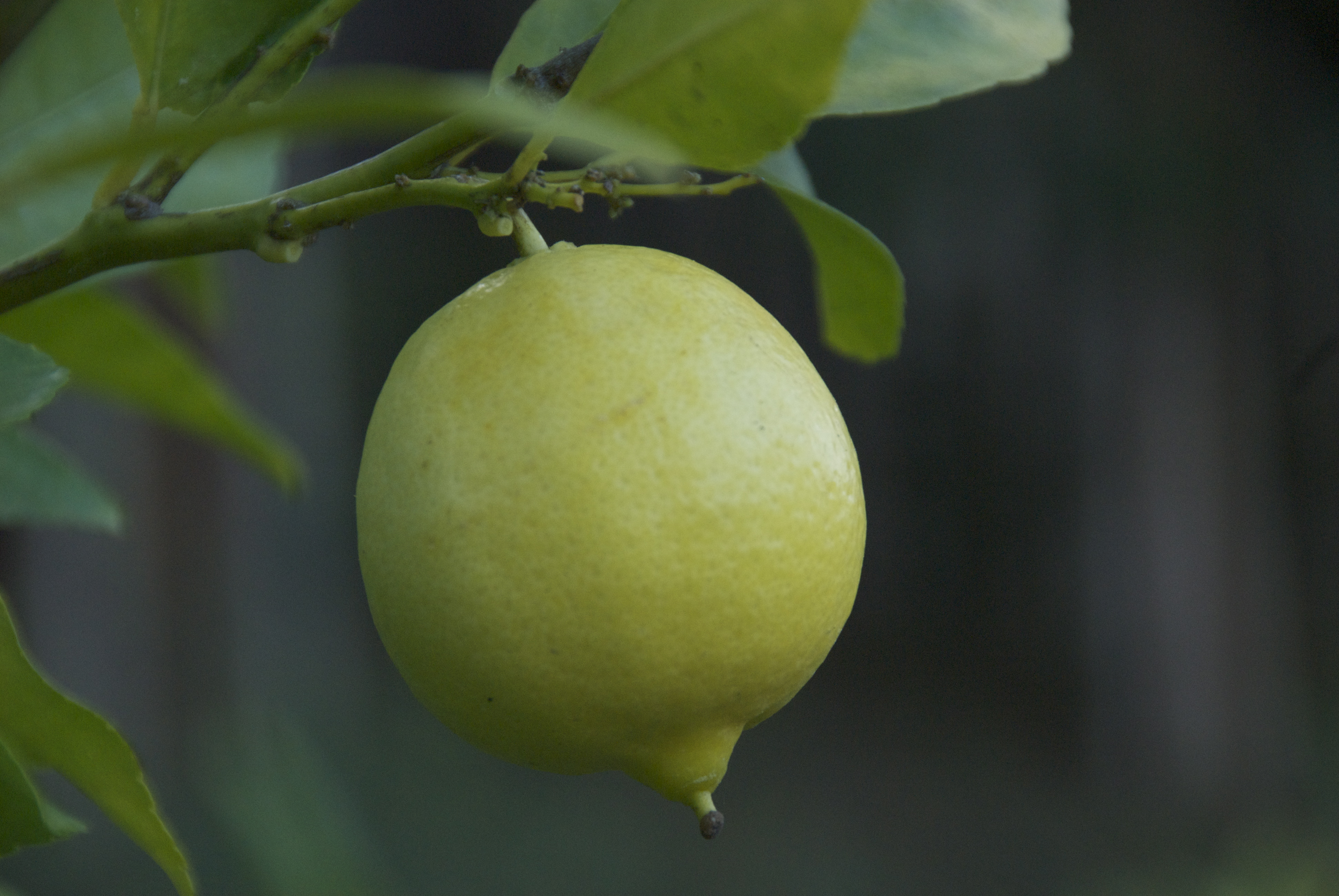
Meyer lemon approaching ripeness

== Cultivation ==
The Meyer lemon is popular as an ornamental plant for its compact size, hardiness, and productivity. It is decorative and suitable for container growing. It is one of the sweetest lemons, and even the skin is edible. Growing a Meyer lemon tree can either be done in a pot or straight from the ground, but the plant requires plenty of sunlight. However, too much sunlight is possible and can burn the plant if exposed for long periods. This is why summer sun, morning sunlight, and some afternoon shade are ideal for taking the best care of the lemon tree. The tree is reasonably hardy and grows well in warm climates. It is fairly vigorous, with a plant grown from a young graft usually beginning to fruit in four years, yielding thousands of lemons over its lifetime. These plants require an adequate amount of water but well-drained soil is crucial. However, allowing the soil to dry out slightly between watering keeps the plant moist enough, but not too moist or dry. Along with watering and sunlight, Meyer lemon trees need high nitrogen fertilizer that is slow-releasing. These plants should only be given fertilizer within the growing season (spring-fall) and never in the winter unless the leaves are yellowing; then, they should be given water and fertilizer. While fruit is produced throughout the year, the majority of the crop is harvest-ready in winter. Trees require adequate water, but less in the winter. For maximum yield, they should be fertilized during growing periods. New branches are thorny to protect the young shoots, but the thorns transform into secondary branches with age. Pruning plays a very important role in growing the most successful tree; this keeps the plant in shape and avoids unnecessary overcrowding plants to leave room for the lemons. It allows the plant to receive the proper airflow, which enhances the plant to grow strong and well while also preventing the plant from any potential diseases.

== Culinary uses ==
The Meyer lemon is sweeter than other lemons with only a slight tartness, and is said to taste a bit like a tangerine, or a navel orange. It is often used to season fish and seafood.

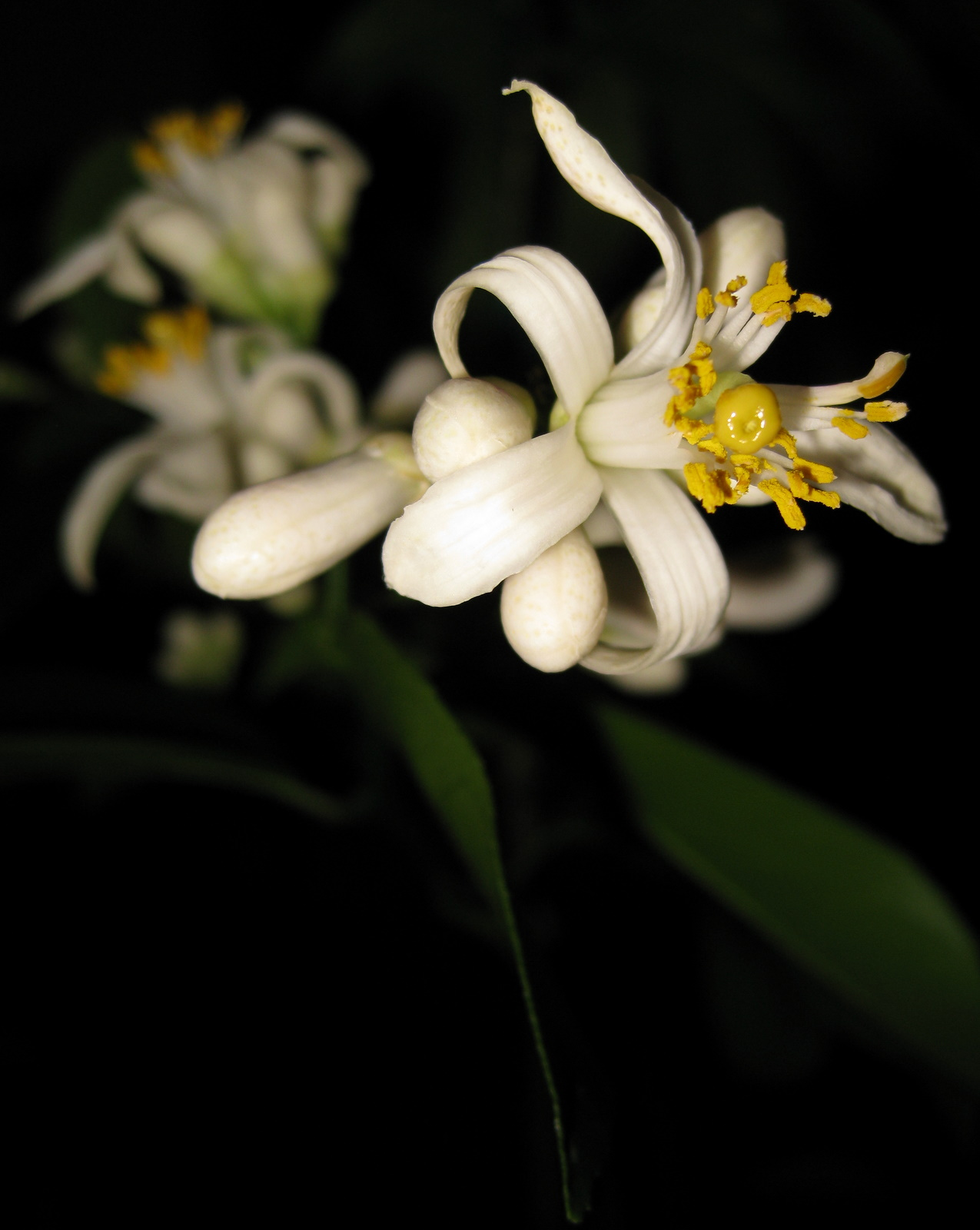
Closeup of 'Improved Meyer Lemon' flower

== Improved Meyer ==
By the mid-1940s, the Meyer lemon had grown widely in California. However, at that time, it was discovered that most of the Meyer lemon trees being cloned were asymptomatic carriers of the Citrus tristeza virus, which had killed millions of citrus trees all over the world and rendered other millions useless for production. After this finding, most of the Meyer lemon trees in the United States were destroyed to save other citrus trees.

A virus-free selection was found in the 1950s and was certified and released in 1975 by the University of California as the 'Improved Meyer lemon' – Citrus × meyeri 'Improved'.
