= Frank Nicholas Meyer =

American botanist

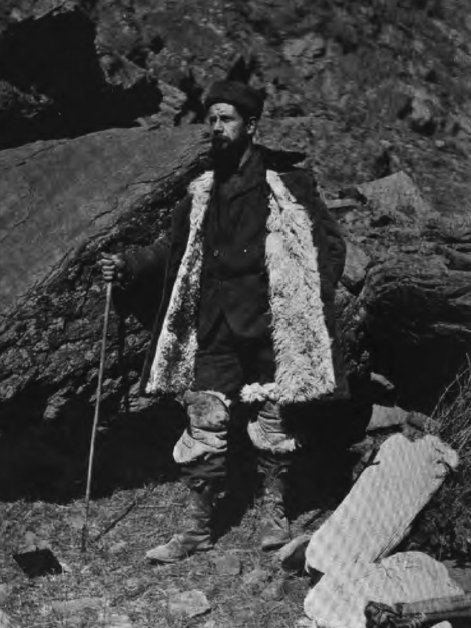
- Meyer c. 1909
- Born: Frans Nicolaas Meijer; 30 November 1875; Amsterdam, Netherlands
- Died: 2 June 1918 (aged 42) near Shanghai, China
- Occupation: Botanical exploration
- Employer: United States Department of Agriculture

Frank Nicholas Meyer (30 November 1875 – 2 June 1918) was a United States Department of Agriculture explorer who travelled to Asia to collect new plant species. The Meyer lemon was named in his honor.

== Biography ==
He was born Frans Nicolaas Meijer in Amsterdam in 1875. For seven years Meijer was educated at the Hortus Botanicus in Amsterdam as an assistant of Hugo de Vries. He emigrated to the United States in 1901 and became an American citizen in November 1908 adopting the name "Frank N. Meyer". In 1901 he first went to work for Erwin F. Smith at the United States Department of Agriculture. In 1902, Meyer began working at USDA's Plant Introduction Station in Santa Ana, California. Meyer was hired in 1905 by the USDA in their Office of Seed and Plant Introduction to send back to the United States economically useful plants as part of an effort, initiated in 1898, to augment United States agriculture and horticulture with plant varieties collected around the world. A particular focus of the program was to introduce drought resistant plants suitable for dry land farming, a demand driven by concentrated agricultural expansion into the Great Plains. By 1912, the program had introduced over 34,000 species. These were submitted to testing and selection at plant introduction stations, such as in Chico, California, and incorporated into then developing plant breeding programs. Through an arrangement with Charles Sprague Sargent and David Fairchild Meyer was also to send to the Arnold Arboretum trees and shrubs of ornamental value. They archived images he collected of his travels.

Meyer's 2,500 plant introductions include wild and cultivated forage crops, such as alfalfa, drought-hardy small grains, such as sorghum, and many varieties of citrus, stone fruits, and nuts. Prior to 1903, eight varieties of soy bean were grown in the United States. Meyer collected forty-two varieties, including the first oil-bearing variety, which supplies an ingredient for industrial processes. David Fairchild (1919) reported that, Meyer's "notes, published in the “Inventories of Seeds and Plants Imported” of the Office of Foreign Seed and Plant Introduction, are full of suggestions to plant breeders, and, luckily, his suggestions are backed up by living material which will make it easy to provide the breeders with many of the plants which he describes.”

Meyer is also responsible for collecting specimens in China that showed that the fungus now known as Cryphonectria parasitica, responsible for the Chestnut blight disease first observed in the Bronx Zoo in 1904 and that had started killing American chestnut trees, was present on Chinese trees, confirming suspicions that it had originated from imported nursery stock.

== Expeditions ==
=== First Asian expedition ===
Frank Meyer accepted David Fairchild's proposition to collect plants for the USDA in China and began preparations for the trip, arriving in Peking (now Beijing) in September 1905. The expedition would last two and a half years, taking him to the Ming Tombs Valley, Mongolia, Manchuria, Korea and Siberia. In February 1907 in Shanghai, China, Meyer had an awkward meeting with Arnold Arboretum plant explorer Ernest H. Wilson concerning collecting requirements; however, they later became good friends. Meyer concentrated on collecting seeds and scions of fruit trees and other edible plants such as the Chinese pistachio (Pistacia chinensis), wild peach trees (Prunus davidiana) and a dwarf lemon (Citrus x meyeri), as well as ornamentals such as a maple (Acer truncatum), a columnar juniper (Juniperus chinensis ‘Columnaris’) and the Amur lilac (Syringa amurensis.)

=== Second Asia-Europe expedition ===
Meyer returned to the United States in the summer of 1908 and spent the next year visiting agricultural experiment stations and sorting the photographs from his expedition. In the fall of 1909, he returned to Asia by way of Europe, where he visited Kew and other botanical gardens on the continent. Meyer continued on to Crimea, where he made several significant discoveries and continued on to Azerbaidzhan, Armenia, Turkmenistan, and Chinese Turkestan (now Xinjiang), all the while collecting numerous specimens for the USDA and the Arnold Arboretum. Early 1911 found Meyer and his party exploring and collecting along the border of Mongolia and Siberia. Political unrest forced him westwards instead of continuing on into China. He journeyed up the Volga and then on to St. Petersburg and western Europe. He returned to the United States in April 1912 on the RMS Mauretania, one day behind the ill-fated Titanic.

=== Third Asia-Europe expedition ===
After a brief stay in America, Meyer prepared to return to Asia. The USDA Division of Forest Pathology tasked him with determining the origins of chestnut blight, suspecting it originated in Asia. He successfully proved that it had developed in China. In December 1913, Meyer and his team departed Beijing for Shaanxi Province, then continued to Shanxi and Henan Provinces, collecting numerous specimens, scions, and seeds along the way. Although he had planned to explore Gansu, his activities were curtailed due to the loss of his interpreter and the presence of bandits. The expedition returned to Beijing, but soon set off again for the same area of country from which they had just returned, journeying on to Gansu and the Tibetan borderlands (now Qinghai). In November 1914, he journeyed north to Lanzhou to collect more specimens, and finally began the return trip to Beijing at the beginning of 1915. After packing his specimens and collecting additional materials at Fairchild's request, the party traveled south to Hangzhou, and Huzhou Mount Mogan by way of Nanjing, and on to Shanghai and Japan and finally to America.

=== Fourth Asian expedition ===
Meyer's fourth, and last, expedition set off in mid-1916 and was tasked with collecting wild pears (Pyrus ussuriensis and Pyrus calleryana) because they were found to be the only varieties capable of withstanding fire blight (Bacillus amylovrus). Meyer and his interpreter and guide, Chow-hai Ting, journeyed up the Yangtze River (Chang Jiang) in search of the Callery pear (Pyrus calleryana), and later traveled to Jingmen, where he collected 5,000 pounds of pears. Meyer returned to Yichang and was trapped there by civil unrest, being forced to spend the winter of 1917. In May 1918, he and his guide managed to return to Jingmen and collect his belongings and catch a ship down the Yangtze (Chang Jiang) bound for Hangou. In June 1918 he traveled to Shanghai over the Yangtze River on the Japanese riverboat Feng Yang Maru. He was last seen leaving his cabin on June 1, at 11:20 pm. On June 5 his body was found some 50 km before the city of Wuhu by a Chinese sailor. He was buried in Shanghai on June 12 and his family in the Netherlands were notified of his death on June 18.

== Works ==
- Meyer, Frank Nicholas and David Fairchild. South China explorations. Typescript, July 25, 1916 – September 21, 1918.
- Meyer, Frank Nicholas. Letters of Frank N. Meyer. Typescript,1902-[1918].
- Meyer, Frank Nicholas. Agricultural Explorations in the Fruit and Nut Orchards of China. USDA Bureau of Plant Industry - Bulletin No. 204, Issued March 25, 1911.

The standard author abbreviation F.N.Meijer is used to indicate this person as the author when citing a botanical name.

== Legacy ==
In recognition of his industry, the Frank N. Meyer Medal for Plant Genetic Resources was struck by his United States Department of Agriculture colleagues, funded by his bequest to the organization.
