= David Fairchild =

American botanist (1869–1954)

David G. Fairchild
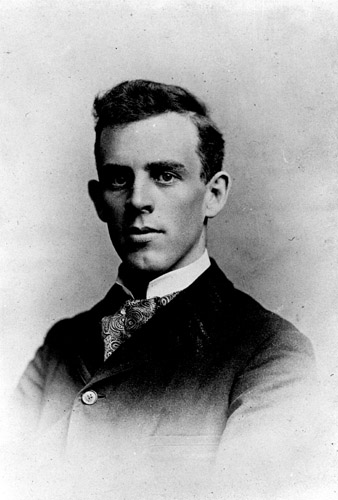
- Born: April 7, 1869; Lansing, Michigan, U.S.
- Died: August 6, 1954 (aged 85); Coconut Grove, Miami, Florida, U.S.
- Education: Kansas State College of Agriculture, Iowa State University, Rutgers University
- Known for: Incorporating non-native food and other commercial plants into American agriculture
- Spouse: Marian Hubbard Bell (daughter of Alexander Graham Bell)
- Children: Alexander Graham Bell Fairchild, Nancy Bell (who married Marston Bates)
- Father: George Fairchild
- Awards: Honorary D.Sc. from Oberlin College, Public Welfare Medal (1933)
- Scientific career
- Fields: Botany
- Workplaces: U.S. Department of Agriculture; University of Miami
- Patrons: Barbour Lathrop, Allison Armour
- Author abbrev. (botany): D.Fairchild

David Grandison Fairchild (April 7, 1869 – August 6, 1954) was an American botanist and plant explorer. Fairchild was responsible for the introduction of more than 200,000 exotic plants and varieties of established crops into the United States, including soybeans, pistachios, mangos, nectarines, dates, bamboos, and flowering cherries. Certain varieties of wheat, cotton, and rice became especially economically important.

== Early life and education ==
Fairchild was born in Lansing, Michigan and was raised in Manhattan, Kansas. He was a member of the Fairchild family, descendants of Thomas Fairchild of Stratford, Connecticut. He graduated from Kansas State College of Agriculture (B.A. 1888, M.S. 1889) where his father, George Fairchild, was president. He continued his studies at Iowa State and at Rutgers with his uncle, Byron Halsted, a noted biologist. He received an honorary D.Sc. degree from Oberlin College in 1915.

== Career ==
Barbour Lathrop, a wealthy world traveler, persuaded Fairchild to become a plant explorer for the United States Department of Agriculture. Lathrop and another wealthy patron, Allison Armour, financed some of Fairchild's many explorations for new plants to be introduced into the U.S. Fairchild was the author of a number of popular books on his plant collecting expeditions. Of those early travels, Fairchild wrote, "I am glad that I saw a few of the quiet places of the world before the coming of automobiles...".

For many years Fairchild managed the Office of Seed and Plant Introduction of the U.S. Department of Agriculture in Washington, D.C. One accomplishment was to help introduce flowering cherry trees from Japan to Washington. He is also credited with introducing kale, quinoa and avocados to Americans. In 1898, he established the introduction garden for tropical plants in Miami, Florida. In 1905 he married Marian Bell, the younger daughter of Alexander Graham Bell. Fairchild was a member of the board of trustees of the National Geographic Society, and an officer in what is now called the Alexander Graham Bell Association for the Deaf and Hard of Hearing.

In 1926, the Fairchilds built a home on an 8-acre (32,000 m^{2}) parcel on Biscayne Bay in Coconut Grove, Florida. They named it "The Kampong", after similar family compounds in Java, Indonesia, where Fairchild had spent so many happy days collecting plants. He covered this property with an extraordinary collection of rare tropical trees and plants and eventually wrote a book about the place, entitled The World Grows Round my Door. In 1984, The Kampong became part of the National Tropical Botanical Garden. In 1938, he was honored by having the Fairchild Tropical Botanic Garden in Coral Gables named after him. He was also the namesake of David Fairchild Elementary in South Miami.

=== University of Miami ===
Fairchild was a member of the board of regents of the University of Miami from 1929 to 1933. For three of those years he was chairman of the board. In 1933, he was awarded the Public Welfare Medal from the National Academy of Sciences.

His son, Alexander Graham Bell Fairchild, lived and worked as a research entomologist for 33 years at the Gorgas Memorial Laboratory in Panama. His daughter, Nancy Bell, married another entomologist, Marston Bates, author of many books on natural history. She herself wrote a book, East of the Andes and West of Nowhere, about living in rural Colombia during the 1940s.

Fairchild is commemorated in the scientific name of a species of lizard, Anolis fairchildi. Several plants were named after Fairchild, including Indigofera heudelotii var. fairchildii (Baker f.) J.B.Gillett, Elaeocarpus fairchildii Merr., Actinidia × fairchildii Rehder, and Ficus fairchildii Backer.

== Plant introductions ==
=== Southwestern (Pima) cotton ===
David Fairchild played an important role in introducing cotton to the southwestern United States. Circa 1900, the United States led the world in cotton production, with its large production of “upland” cotton in the southeastern part of the country, and its high quality sea island along the Atlantic coast. At the time, the southwestern United States did not produce commercial quantities of cotton. Egypt then led the world with a class of cotton higher quality than "upland" and more economical than "sea island". H. J. Webber and others in the United States Department of Agriculture believed Egyptian cultivars would thrive, under irrigation, in the deserts of the southwestern United States. On behalf of the USDA, David Fairchild visited Egypt in 1902 and brought back a few cultivars. A USDA team led by Thomas H. Kearney selected among these cultivars, and after a decade of refinement, released the first cultivar successful in the southwestern United States. This particularly high quality cotton eventually came to be known as Pima.

== Works ==
Fairchild wrote four books that describe his extensive world travels and his work introducing new plant species to the United States. Beside sharing his legendary tropical botanical expertise, Fairchild provided graphic accounts of native cultures he was able to see before their modernization. He was an accomplished photographer and illustrated these books himself.

- The World Was My Garden: Travels of a Plant Explorer (New York: C. Scribner's Sons, 1938)
- Garden Islands of the Great East: Collecting Seeds from the Philippines and Netherlands India in the Junk 'Chêng ho (New York: C. Scribner's Sons, 1943)
- The World Grows Round My Door; The Story of The Kampong, a Home on The Edge of the Tropics (New York: C. Scribner's Sons, 1947)
- Exploring for Plants. (New York: Macmillan, 1930)

The World Was My Garden won a National Book Award as the Bookseller Discovery of 1938, voted by members of the American Booksellers Association. The discovery was "the most deserving book which failed to receive adequate sales and recognition."

In addition Fairchild and his wife Marian wrote an early book on macro photography of insects titled Book of Monsters (Washington, D.C.: National Geographic Society, 1914). Fairchild also wrote numerous monographs about plants, plant exploring, and the transportation and cultivation of new plants in the United States.

== Biographies ==
Multiple biographies have been written about Fairchild, including The Food Explorer by Daniel Stone, Fruits of Eden by Amanda Harris, and Adventures in a Green World by Marjorie Stoneman Douglas.

== See also ==
- The Kampong, the home and personal introduction garden of David Grandison Fairchild
