= Multilingual Multiscript Plant Name Database =

Multilingual plant taxa name database

The Multilingual Multiscript Plant Name Database (MMPND) was a massive, historic botanical repository hosted originally by the University of Melbourne and managed by Michel H. Porcher. It catalogued plant names of economic importance, providing botanical names, synonyms and common names in nearly 100 languages and 40 scripts. Despite its name the database is a collection of html files. This choice was initially made to avoid technical issues with databases software related to foreign fonts.

It was created in the early nineties out of the frustration with books regarding costs and availability. The global enthusiasm for computer technology applied to multilingual botanical nomenclature provided a great opportunity to break new ground. Despite the lack of foreign fonts the project went ahead. At the time the foreign scripted names were represented with gifs until the main fonts became available.

The project attracted international attention and generated cooperation from the main world botanical databases such as the US GRIN, FAO Agrovoc, IPNI etc.

In the early twenty-twenties following funding cuts the project was brought to a halt and became an archived document. Years later Michel Porcher decided to pursue the compiling of the MMPND via the simplest blog available under the pseudonym “the hortibloke”, referring to previous related works

Presently the MMPND being archived it means that the internal links are still functioning, most files can be viewed, but practically all external links are outdated and / or broken.

The new MMPND blog, a modern extension to the historical site, provides updates of 3 to 7 new genera per month. A quick glance comparing any original compiling to a new updated version will demonstrate the extent of the new plant names brought to the blog.
