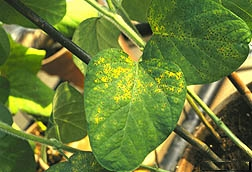

Scientific classification
- Kingdom: Fungi
- Division: Basidiomycota
- Class: Pucciniomycetes
- Order: Pucciniales
- Family: Phakopsoraceae
- Genus: Phakopsora
- Species: P. pachyrhizi

Binomial name
- Phakopsora pachyrhizi Syd. & P. Syd., (1914)
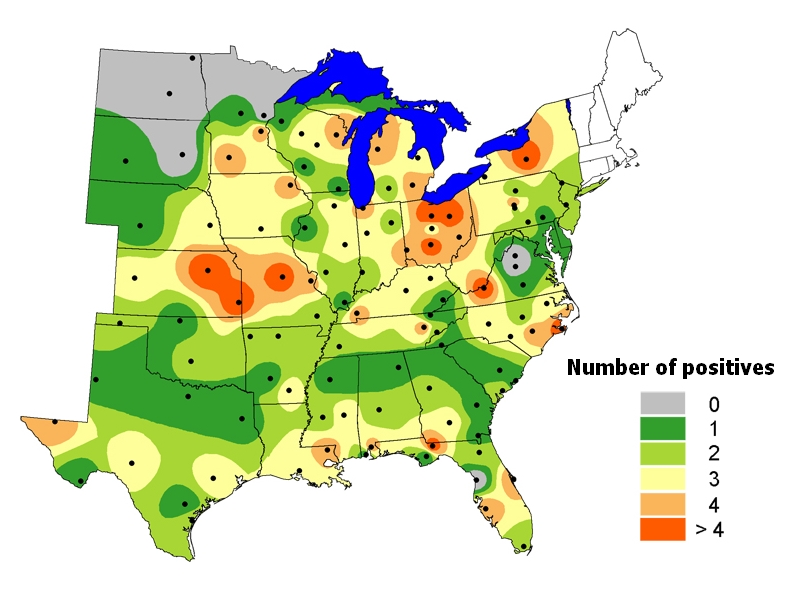
- Contour map showing numbers of NADP sites testing positive for P. pachyrhizi in the center and east of US in 2006

Synonyms
- Malupa sojae; Malupa vignae; Phakopsora sojae; Phakopsora vignae; Physopella pachyrhizi; Uredo sojae; Uredo vignae; Uromyces sojae

= Phakopsora pachyrhizi =

Species of fungus

Phakopsora pachyrhizi is a plant pathogen. It causes Asian soybean rust.

== Hosts ==
Phakopsora pachyrhizi is an obligate biotrophic pathogen that causes Asian soybean rust. Phakopsora pachyrhizi is able to affect up to 31 different plant species that belong to 17 different genera under natural conditions. Experiments in laboratories were able to use P. pachyrhizi to infect 60 more plant species. The main hosts are Glycine max (soybean), Glycine soja (wild soybean), and Pachyrhizus erosus (Jicama).

Scientific name	Common name
Alysicarpus glumaceus	Alyce clover
Alysicarpus nummularifolius	
Alysicarpus rugosus	Alyce clover
Alysicarpus vaginalis	Alyce clover
Cajanus cajan*	Cajan, pigeon pea
Calopogonium mucunoides	
Canavalia gladiate	Swordbean
Centrosema pubescens	Butterfly pea
Clitoria termatea	Kordofan pea, butterfly pea, Asian pigeon wings
Coronilia varia	Crownvetch
Crotalaria anagyroides	Rattlebox
Crotalaria saltiana	Rattlebox
Crotaria spectabilis	
Delonix regia	Poinciana or royal Poinciana
Desmodium triflorum	Three-flower beggarweed
Erythrina subumbrans	Dadap
Erythrina variegate	Indian coral tree
Glycine canescens	Soybean relative
Glycine clandestine	Soybean relative
Glycine clandestine	Soybean relative
Glycine falcadata	Soybean relative
Glycine max*	Soybean
Glycine soja	
Glycine tabacina	Soybean relative
Kennedia prostrata	
Kennedia rubicunda	
Lablab purpureus	Lablab, hyacinth bean
Lespedeza bicolor	Lespedeza
Lespedeza striata	Lespedeza
Lespedeza stipulaceae	Lespedeza
Lotus spp.	Trefoil
Lotus Americana	
Lupinus *	Lupines
Lupinus albus	White lupine
Lupinus angustifolius	Narrow-leaved lupine
Lupinus hirsutus	Blue lupine
Lupinus luteus	Yellow lupine
M. speciosus	
Macroptilium atropurpurem	Siratro, purple bean siratro
Macrotyloma axilare	
Medicago arborea	Medic
Medicago lupulina	Black medic
Melilotus officinalis	Yellow sweet clover
Mucuna	Velvetbean
Mucuna cochinchinesis	Velvetbean relative
Neonotonia (glycine) wrightii	Glycine
Pachyrhizus ahipa *	Yam bean
Pachyrhizus erosus *	Yam bean, Jicama, chop suey bean
Phaseolus lunatus *	Buttler bean, lima bean
Phaseolus vulgaris *	Kidney bean, green bean
Pisum sativum	Peas (green)
Psophocarpus tetragonolobus	Winged bean or Goa
Pueraria lobate*	Kudzu
Puerarua montana var. Lobata*	Kudzu
Puerarua phaseoloides	Tropical kudzu
Rhynchosia minima	
Senna obtusifolia	Sickpod
Senna occidentalis	Coffee senna
Sesbania exaltada	Colorado River hemp, hemp sesbania, coffeebean
Sesbania macrocarpa	Peatree or Colorado River hemp
Sesbania vescaria	
Trifolium repens	White clover
Trifolium incarnatum	Crimson clover
Trigonella foenum-graicum	Fenugreek
Trigonella foenum-gracecum	Fenugreek
Vicia angustifolia	Narrow-leaf vetch
Vicia dasycarpa	Wooly-pod vetch
Vicia faba	Broadbean or fava bean
Vicia narbonensis	Broad-leaved vetch
Vicia villosa ssp. Varia	Woolypod vetch
Vigna mungo	Urd or black gram
Vigna radiate*	Mung bean
Vigna unguiculata*	Cowpea, black-eye pea, yearlong bean
Voandzeia subterranea	Bambara groundnut

*Preferred hosts. Other hosts were minor or determined experimentally under artificial conditions.

== Symptoms ==
The disease forms tan to dark-brown or reddish-brown lesions with one to many prominent, globe-like orifices. Urediniospores form from these pores. At initial stages, small yellow spots are formed on the surface of the leaf. These spots may be better observed using assistance of a light source. As the disease progresses, lesions start to form on the leaves, stems, pod, and petioles. Lesions are initially small, turning from gray to tan or brown as they increase in size and the disease gets more severe. Soon volcano-shaped marks are noticed in the lesions.

== Disease cycle ==
Phakopsora pachyrhizi is a fungus which has a spore moved by wind, called urediniospore. These spores are quite different from others as they don't need an open stomata or natural openings in the leaves. Urediniospores are able to penetrate the leaf. Pustules are visible after 10 days and they can produce spores for three weeks. The disease reaches its climax when the crop begins flowering. The cycle of the pathogen continues until the crop is defoliated or until the environment becomes unfavorable to the pathogen.

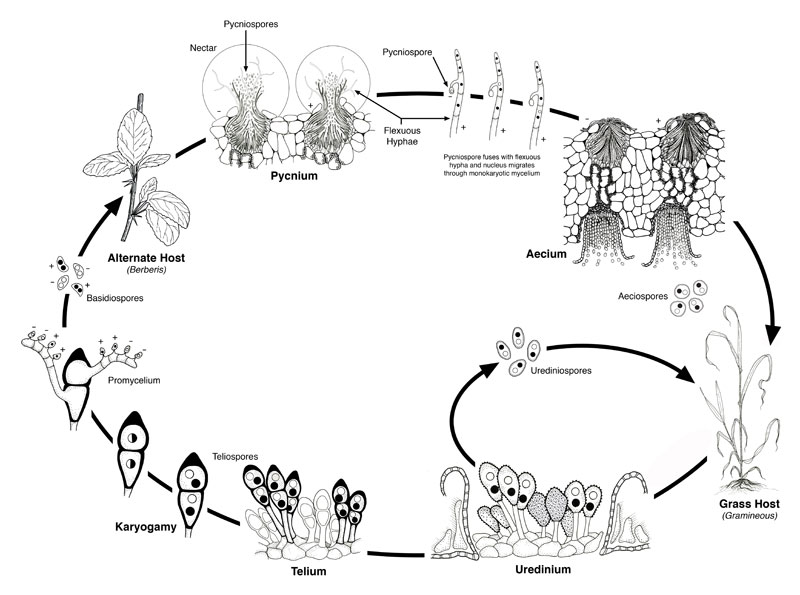

The Asian soybean rust is a polycyclic disease: within the disease cycle, the asexual urediniospores keep infecting the same plant. Teliospores (sexual spores) are the survival spores that overwinter in the soil. Basidiospores are the spores that are able to contaminate an alternative host. The urediniospores need a minimum of six hours to infect leaves at a favorable temperature (between 15 and 24 °C (59 and 75 °F)).

== Environment ==
The favorable conditions for the disease to progress are related to temperature, humidity, and wind. The appropriate temperature for the pathogen to be active is 12 to 29 °C (54 to 84 °F) (more efficient between 18 and 26.5 °C (64.4 and 79.7 °F)). The humidity must be high, about 90% or more, for more than 12 hours. A significant amount of wind is also important for the pathogen to move from one plant to the other. Currently, in the United States, infected plants can be found in Florida, Georgia, Louisiana, and Texas.

== Risk factors ==
Uredospores are wind-blown and are produced abundantly on the infected tissue of soybeans or other legume hosts.

== Management ==
The disease is often controlled using the fungicides oxycarboxin, triforine, and triclopyr.

Phakospsora pachyrhizi is a pathogen that acts quickly in contaminating the host. The plant can be severely contaminated in as short a period as 10 days. This makes it difficult to control the disease, as it does not just spread quickly, but its progression is also fast. That is why it is important to implement control techniques as soon as possible.

=== Genetic resistance ===
The disease may be controlled by using genetic resistance, but this has not exhibited great results and has not been durable because the soybean genome almost entirely lacks potential genes for ASR resistance. (Note: p. 664, "Previous work did not identify novel soybean germplasm that displayed immunity to ASR and identified only 33 accessions with moderate RB type resistance, and thus revealed that the number of ASR resistance genes in soybean germplasm is limited^{[16]}. Resistance genes that provide immunity to ASR are a valuable resource.") A gene from Cajanus cajan has shown promise when transferred to soybean. (Note: p. 664, "In conclusion, we have identified and cloned a gene from C. cajan that confers resistance to P. pachyrhizi when expressed in soybean.") (Note: p. 664, "Thus, the significance of this work is the demonstration that it is possible to effectively transfer a dominant resistance gene from a related legume into soybean.") This method could be expanded to a wide array of genes in the entire family; (Note: p. 664, "The Fabaceae (Leguminosae) is a large and diverse plant family, with around 700 genera and 20,000 species^{[29]}. Our results suggest that this tremendous natural resource can be used to identify additional resistance genes against ASR that are absent from the soybean gene pool.") (Note: p. 664, "These legume resistance genes could be used to develop durable and environmentally sustainable ASR control strategies.") as with native genes these are best deployed in combination due to P. pachyrhizi's ability to rapidly overcome resistance. (Note: p. 664, "Finally, although we have not been able to identify P. pachyrhizi isolates that can overcome CcRpp1, P. pachyrhizi has demonstrated that it can rapidly overcome resistance genes that are deployed individually. With 30 million hectares of soybean under cultivation in Brazil, it would be prudent to only deploy CcRpp1 in soybean together with additional resistance genes that have different specificity or different mechanism of ASR resistance, to increase the durability of these resources^{[30]}.")

=== Chemical control ===
A second form of management that can work is using fungicides, but this is only efficient at early stages of the disease. The disease spreads fast and it is complicated to control after certain stages, so it is important to act with care around contaminated plants, as the spores can be attached to clothing and other materials and infect other plants.

== Research ==
Genetic modification for infection factor dissection – including knockout, including of effectors – proves difficult. Host-induced gene silencing may be the better tool for this pathogen.
