= Mole Creek Karst National Park =

- IUCN category II (national park)
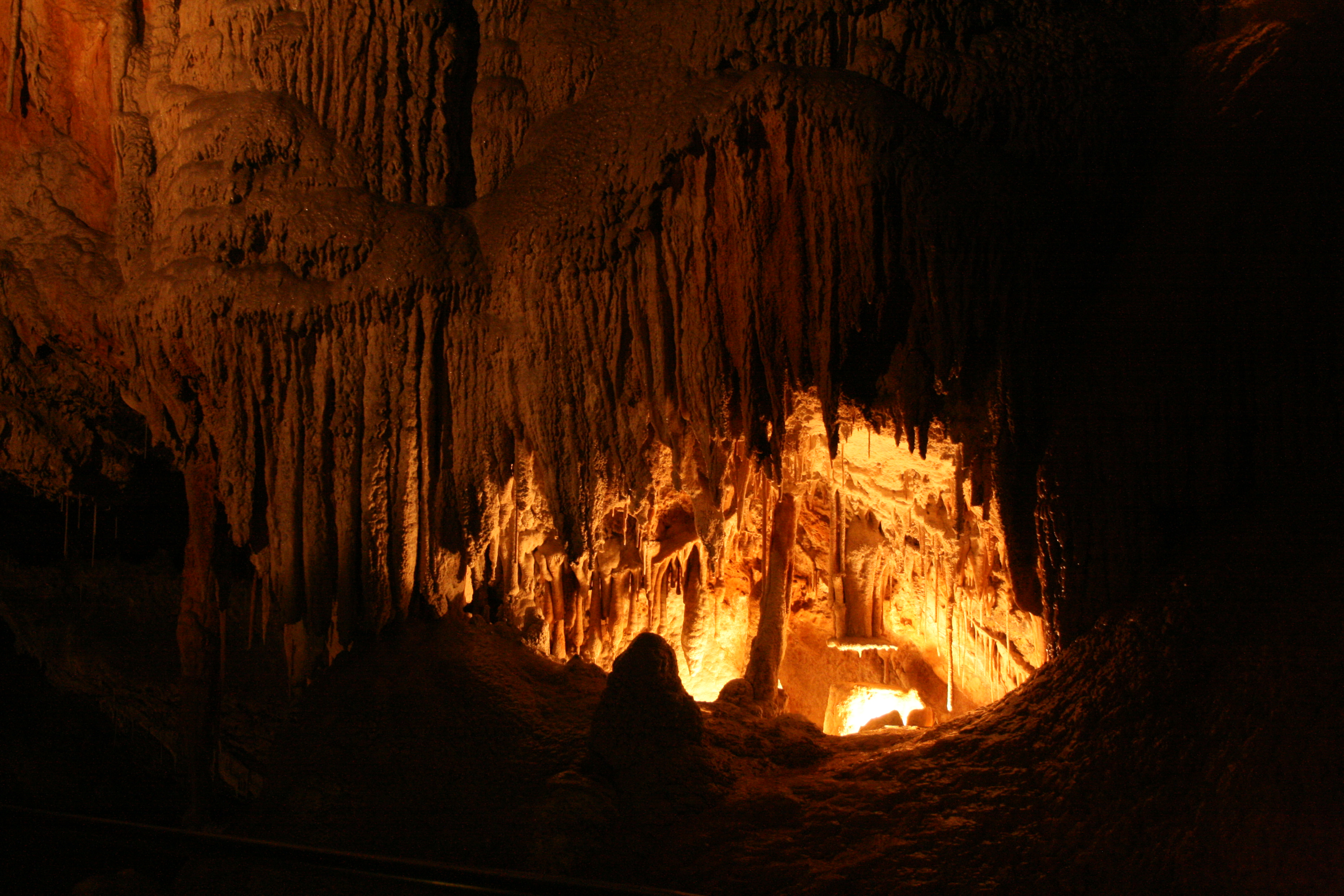
- Inside the Marakoopa Cave

- Location within Tasmania
- Interactive map of Mole Creek Karst National Park
- Location: Tasmania
- Nearest city: Deloraine
- Coordinates: 41°36′02″S 146°17′22″E
- Area: 13.45 km^{2} (5.19 sq mi)
- Established: 1996
- Governing body: Tasmania Parks and Wildlife Service
- Website: Official website

UNESCO World Heritage Site
- Criteria: Cultural: iii, iv, vi, vii; natural: viii, ix, x
- Reference: 181
- Inscription: 1982 (6th Session)

Mole Creek Karst is a national park situated in the North of Tasmania, Australia, 168 km northwest of Hobart. It is located on the slopes of the Great Western Tiers to the east of the town of Mole Creek. It is the only national park in Tasmania created specifically to protect karst landforms. It is part of the Tasmanian Wilderness World Heritage Site.

The national park comprises twelve separate blocks of land, some of which are completely surrounded by cleared, private land, and many of which whose karst features and cave entrances are located outside the bounds of the national park.

The Mole Creek Karst National Park is characterised by its numerous and spectacular cave networks, which attract many tourists each year. Two of these particular caves; King Solomons cave, which features an extensive network of sediment and bone deposit, as well as shawls, and speleothems which make up stalactites and stalagmites., as well as the Marakoopa cave; which is popular for its fantastic glow worm display, and features two underground streams, large caverns, rim pools, reflections and shawl and flowstone features, have been developed as very successful show caves and are the main attraction of the guided cave tours. Many of the caves within the national park remain underdeveloped and are not promoted, although they are visited by the occasional recreational caver. Many other caves are located on private land, and therefore pose an issue in regards to management and conservation.

The national park was declared in 1996 to provide protection for an extensive system of over 300 known caves and sinkholes, including Marakoopa and King Solomons Cave.

The national park is categorised as an IUCN Category II protected area.

== Ecology ==
The Mole Creek Karst National Park features a wide range of flora and fauna, of varying conservation status. These species are contained both in the caves, and in the surrounding forests within the national park. Many of the species present, especially in the caves, are endemic to the area, and therefore are very important in regards to conservation and protection.

=== Fauna ===
There are many animal species present in the Mole Creek Karst National Park that are both unique to the Karst system, and listed as protected cave species. The glow worms Arachnocampus tasmaniensis inhabit many of the caves present in the Mole Creek Karst National Park, and also provide one of the main tourist attractions to the area. The Marakoopa Cave houses one of the most spectacular glow-worm displays in the entire system, and is a major tourist attraction on the guided cave tours.

The karst system is also home to many other protected cave species, such as crickets Micropathus cavernicola, and Parvotettix geode; beetles, Tasmanotrechus cockerilli; harvestman, Hickmanoxyomma gibbergunyar; and pseudoscorpions Pseudotyrannochthonius typhlus. Three species present in the system, listed on the Tasmanian Threatened Species Protection Act 1995, are endemic to the area and confined to the cave systems. Tasmanotrechus cockerilli, a beetle present in the cave systems is a rare and highly cave modified beetle, having evolved to live in a dark cave environment, its eyes have become vestigial. T. cockerilli belongs to the Tribe Trechinae (Family Carabidae) and is listed as vulnerable on the Threatened Species Protection Act 1995.

Pseudotyrannochthonius typhlus, is known as the Mole Creek Cave Pseudoscorpion, and is an incredibly rare animal that makes its home in caves within the Mole Creek karst system. It is known from only about a dozen specimens, and is very rarely sighted. It is listed as rare on the Threatened Species Protection Act 1995.

Finally, Hickmanoxyomma gibbergunyar also known as the Mole Creek Cave Harvestman is a troglobite species, present in many of the cave systems in the Mole Creek area, and is endemic to the Mole Creek Karst. This species is also listed as rare by the Tasmanian Threatened Species Protection Act 1995.

There is a variety of bacteria, algae and fungi associated with the caves which are believed to be involved in crystalline and amorphous speleothem germination and growth.

The following is a list of some of the species within the Mole Creek Karst National Park; both within the caves, and in the surrounding forests. The following species are considered endangered, vulnerable and rare by the Threatened Species Protection Act 1995.

- Accipiter novaehollandiae (grey goshawk): Endangered
- Parameles gunnii gunnii (wastern barred bandicoot): Vulnerable
- Aquila audax fleayi (wedge-tailed eagle): Endangered
- Pseudotyrannochthonius typhlus (cave pseudoscorpion (Mole Creek)): Rare
- Astacopsis gouldi (giant freshwater crayfish): Vulnerable
- Tasmanotrechus cockerilli (cave beetle (Mole Creek)): Rare
- Hickmanoxyomma gibbergunyar (cave harvestman): Rare

The giant freshwater crayfish species Astacopsis gouldi is also considered vulnerable by the Australian Environment Protection and Biodiversity Conservation Act 1999.

=== Flora ===
There is a diverse range of flora in the national park, suited to many different habitats due to the wide variance of different habitats and conditions present.

Forested areas are dominated by brown-top stringybark (Eucalyptus obliqua), white-top stringybark (E. delegatensis), swamp gum (E. regnans), black gum (E. ovata), white gum (E. viminalis), black peppermint (E. amygdalina) and silver wattle (Acacia dealbata), while the underbrush of the forests is mainly shrubby.

Some of the national park has been affected by its surrounding rural environment, as blocks of flora have been modified by fire regimes and grazing on private land. Due to this some of the more burnt areas are open and dominated by sedges and ferns.

There are many sinkholes present in areas of the national park, and many of these are associated with Sphagnum peatlands that are found scattered amongst eucalyptus forests.

The following list of flora species, located in the Mole Creek Karst National Park are considered by the Threatened Species Protection Act 1995 (Tas), to be vulnerable and rare respectively.

- Acacia mucronata var. dependens (variable sallow wattle): Rare
- Glycine microphylla (small-leaf glycine): Vulnerable
- Desmodium gunni (slender tick trefoil): Vulnerable
- Pimelea pauciflora (poison rice flower): Rare
- Epacris exserta (South Esk heath): Vulnerable
- Pomaderris phylicifolia subsp. Phylicifolia (narrow leaf pomaderris): Rare

South Esk heath (Epacris exserta) is also determined by the Environment Protection and Biodiversity Conservation Act 1999 to be endangered.

== Threats ==
=== Tourism in the Mole Creek Karst National Park ===
Tourism is somewhat of a double-edged blade in this national park. While tourism is an important form of revenue to ensure ongoing care and maintenance of the park, as well as an important aspect of education regarding the natural world, and conservation of the flora and fauna within the Mole Creek Karst National Park, it is also by far the greatest threat. Much of the touristic value of the Mole Creek Karst National Park comes from the cave systems. The environment within these cave systems is very stable and closed, and the impact that increase human activity has already had, and will continue to have could be devastating for the long-term survival and success for many flora and fauna species, and fantastic natural wonders present within these caves.

Cave-dwelling species present in the cave systems are easily damaged or killed by cave visitors. People visiting the caves can crush, damage and destroy food sources and important habitats of cave-dwelling species, and also potentially kill rare and endangered species dwelling in the caves. Trampling of floors by large quantities of visitors also hard pack the dirt rendering it unsuitable as habitat for species.

One aspect that draws tourists every year are the fantastic formation of speleothems present in the cave, otherwise known as stalagmites and stalactites, well as the sparkling calcite that adorns many of the cave walls. However, these beautiful natural formations are delicate and easily damaged and destroyed. Visitors in Georgies Hall, Honeycomb 1 cave and Tailender Cave have already caused serious, and in some cases, irreparable damage to speleothems and calcite formations in the caves, by tracking mud and dirt across the delicate surfaces by not sticking to marked paths, or due to irresponsible cave exploring.

Mud and dirt, deposits of hair, lint from clothing and skin follicles, and excess nutrients trekked in from the outside world build up in the caves due to them being cut-off from the outside world. These foreign objects can also destroy the fragile microclimate within the caves, as well as damage unique cave formations, flora, and habitat for fauna.

A large aspect of tourism that effects cave environments is the need to build structures, and provide lighting in order to accommodate tourists and visitors. The building of infrastructure and installation of lights and ventilation necessary to accommodate tourists has been linked to severe changes in the delicate microclimates within caves. These changes in microclimate can be devastating, and in fact have been shown to adversely affect the organisms living in the caves. The Glow Worm cave in New Zealand was closed for 4 months, after approximately only four percent of the glow worm population in the cave had their lights on. It was found to be caused by increased air flow causing a reduction in humidity and increased evaporation. This is an example of the fickle nature of a caves microclimate, and how important it is to the species who rely on it.

It has also been found the fluctuating light levels due to the inclusion of lighting systems in caves to aid in visibility for human access can have detrimental effects on the organisms within a cave. It has been found that the exposure to light can cause glow worms to dim their display, which holds potential detrimental effects to tourism built on glow worm show caves. Another detrimental effect of artificial lights is that they have been seen to cause algae and cyanobacteria to grow in places that they would not usually grow, and the organic acid produced when they grow can potentially damage speleothems and cave paintings.

The presence of humans alone is enough to influence the microclimate of a cave. Carbon dioxide and water are expelled by groups of cave visitors, and as caves are closed systems, these gases accumulate. Banbury and de Freitas found that carbon dioxide builds up in caves over time, and can reach levels that are dangerous for humans. It was also found by Sarbu and Lascu that increased condensation due to increased water vapour has been shown to degrade speleothems. The temperature of a cave can also be greatly altered by the energy given off as body heat and from lights present in the cave system.

=== Future success of conservation ===
The future success of the Mole Creek Karst National Park as both a tourist attraction, and as a conservation refuge is dependent on a combination of management and protection practices.

==== Education ====
The most successful avenue to the continued protection and conservation of the national park and the cave systems, is the education of the public that use them. Much of the physical degradation and damage to cave systems is due to the lack of knowledge of proper conservation minded caving exploration by the people visiting the caves. Providing education in the form of guided tours; which already exist for some of the caves, with tour guides or are knowledgeable and passionate about the conservation of the unique cave flora and fauna, will be a worthwhile aspect in improving education of the delicacy of the cave ecosystems.

Providing signage containing information of the cave species present, their significance to the ecosystem and their delicate nature would help keep the public mindful to take care when exploring caves.

==== Restoration and management ====
Proper restoration and construction of barriers and marked paths within the caves is an important aspect of cave protection and conservation. By marking paths clearly within caves, and roping off areas of significant known fragility, it can be ensured that visitors do not damage or degrade the habitat of cave-dwelling organisms, or the fantastic natural speleothem sand calcite structures present in the caves.

==== Observation ====
Monitoring systems to assess the changes in baseline microclimate aspects would also be a worthwhile investment in the continued protection of fragile cave ecosystems. Timely knowledge of changes in air pressure or intensity, condensation and humidity levels, and temperature of caves could help to thwart potentially catastrophic effects to cave-dwelling organisms caused by changes in their microclimate.

==== Importance of preservation ====
The caves present in the Mole Creek Karst National Park are significantly important in scientific, conservation and recreational aspects. For the purpose of scientific importance and conservation, the caves in the national park contain rare fauna, which exist only in these caves, as well as an entire ecosystem of unique cave-dwelling organisms completely dependent and constrained to the cave systems. These organisms can live only in the caves, and as such, the caves need to be preserved in order to ensure the continued preservation of the organisms they contain. The national park draws visitors from all around the world, and the revenue garnered from their stay helps fund the continued conservation and protection of the Mole Creek Karst National Park.

The national park itself as an entirety contains a wide and diverse range of flora, fauna and landforms, many of which are rare, threatened or endangered. It also possesses many unique natural wonders, such as the karst landscape and its extensive cave network. Protection of the national park ensures the preservation of these species and unique landforms, to be studied and enjoyed by future generations. These aspects are important for no reason other than their own intrinsic value, and inherent uniqueness and beauty, and the continued preservation will ensure it can be enjoyed for generations to come.

== See also ==
- Protected areas of Tasmania
