= Physopella ampelopsidis =

Scientific classification
- Domain: Eukaryota
- Kingdom: Fungi
- Division: Basidiomycota
- Class: Pucciniomycetes
- Order: Pucciniales
- Family: Phakopsoraceae
- Genus: Physopella
- Species: P. ampelopsidis

Binomial name
- Physopella ampelopsidis (Dietel & P. Syd.) Cummins & Ramachar, (1958)

Species of fungus

Physopella ampelopsidis is a plant pathogen.
