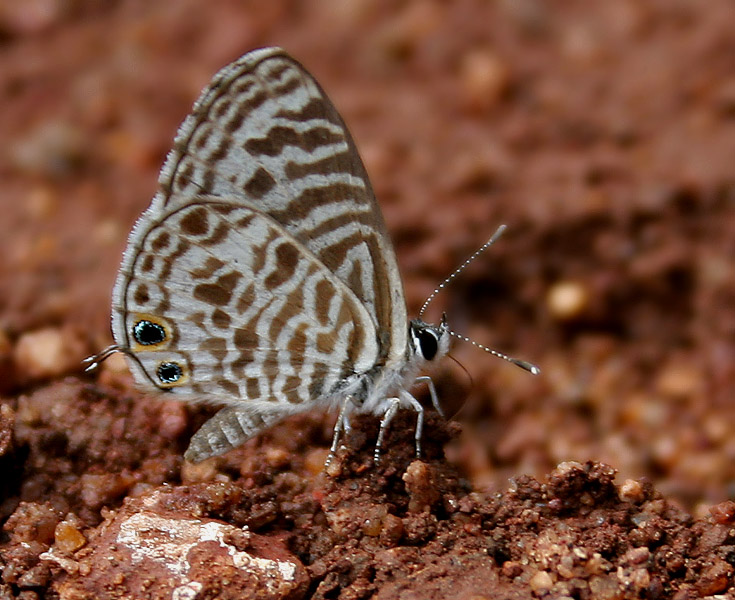
- Mud-puddling in wet season at Ananthagiri Hills, in Ranga Reddy district of Andhra Pradesh, India

Scientific classification
- Kingdom: Animalia
- Phylum: Arthropoda
- Class: Insecta
- Order: Lepidoptera
- Family: Lycaenidae
- Genus: Leptotes
- Species: L. plinius

Binomial name
- Leptotes plinius (Fabricius, 1793)

Synonyms
- Hesperia plinius Fabricius, 1793; Syntarucus plinius; Tarucus plinius (Fabricius, 1793); Tarucus plinius celis Fruhstorfer, 1922; Tarucus plinius plutarchus Fruhstorfer, 1922; Tarucus plinius zingis Fruhstorfer, 1922

= Leptotes plinius =

Zebra blue

Species of butterfly

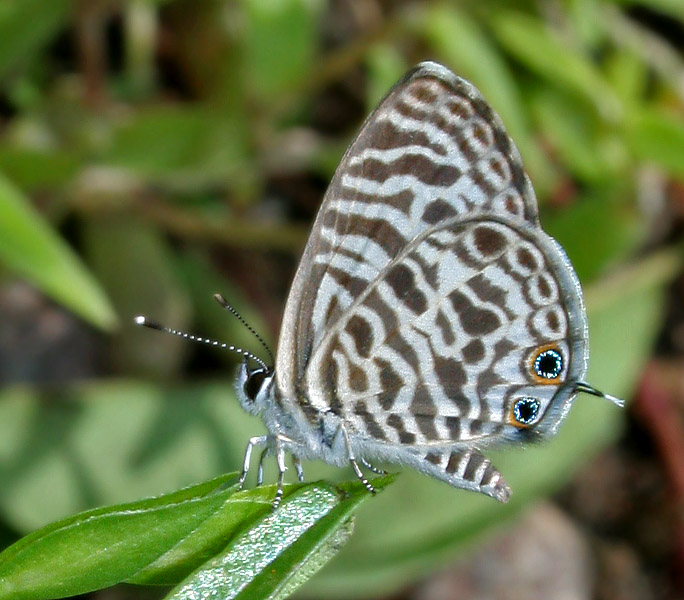
In wet season in Hyderabad, India.

Leptotes plinius, the zebra blue or plumbago blue, is a species of blue butterfly (Lycaenidae) found in Sri Lanka, India to Australia. The species was first described by Johan Christian Fabricius in 1793.

== Description ==
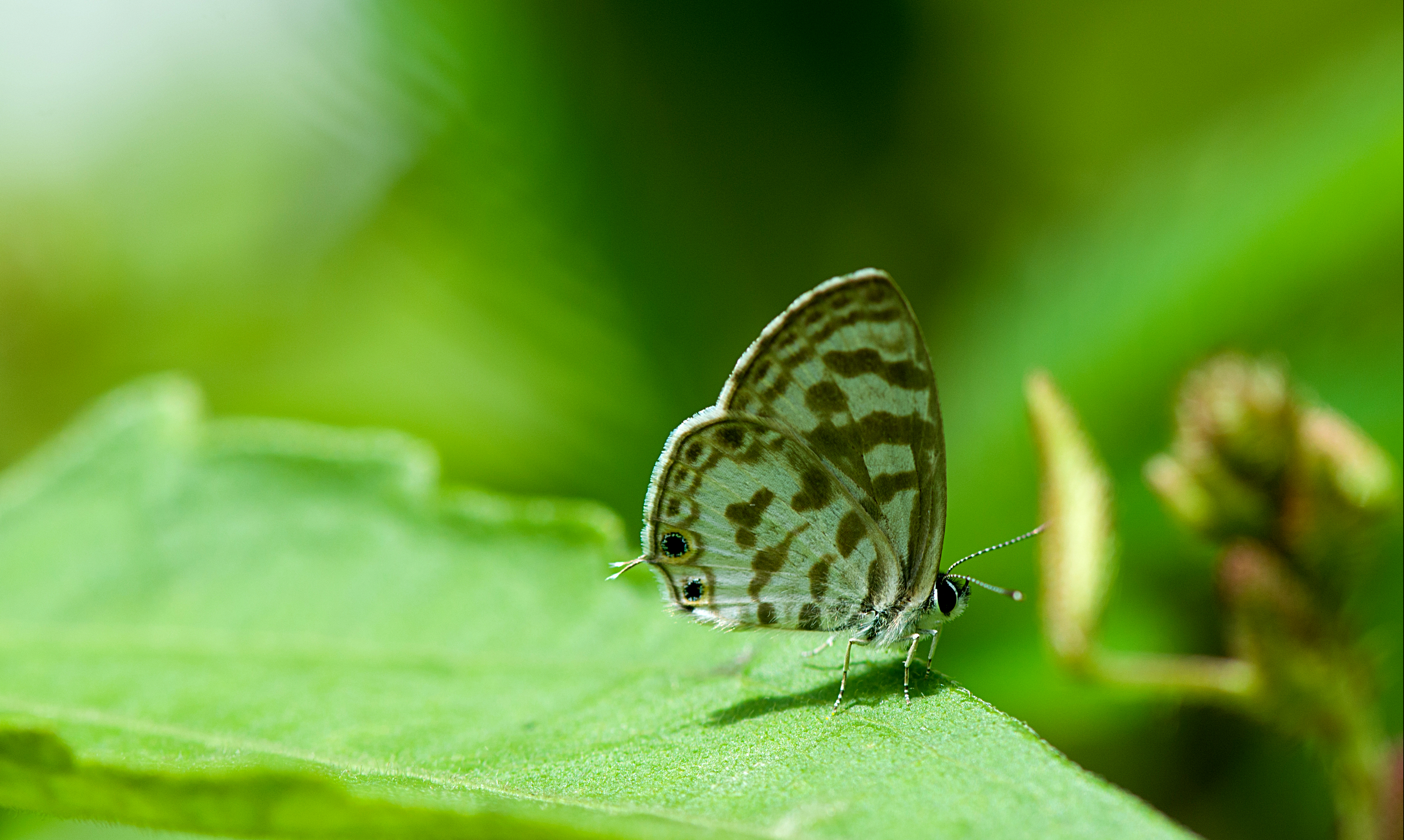
Aberration of zebra blue butterfly seen in Bangalore

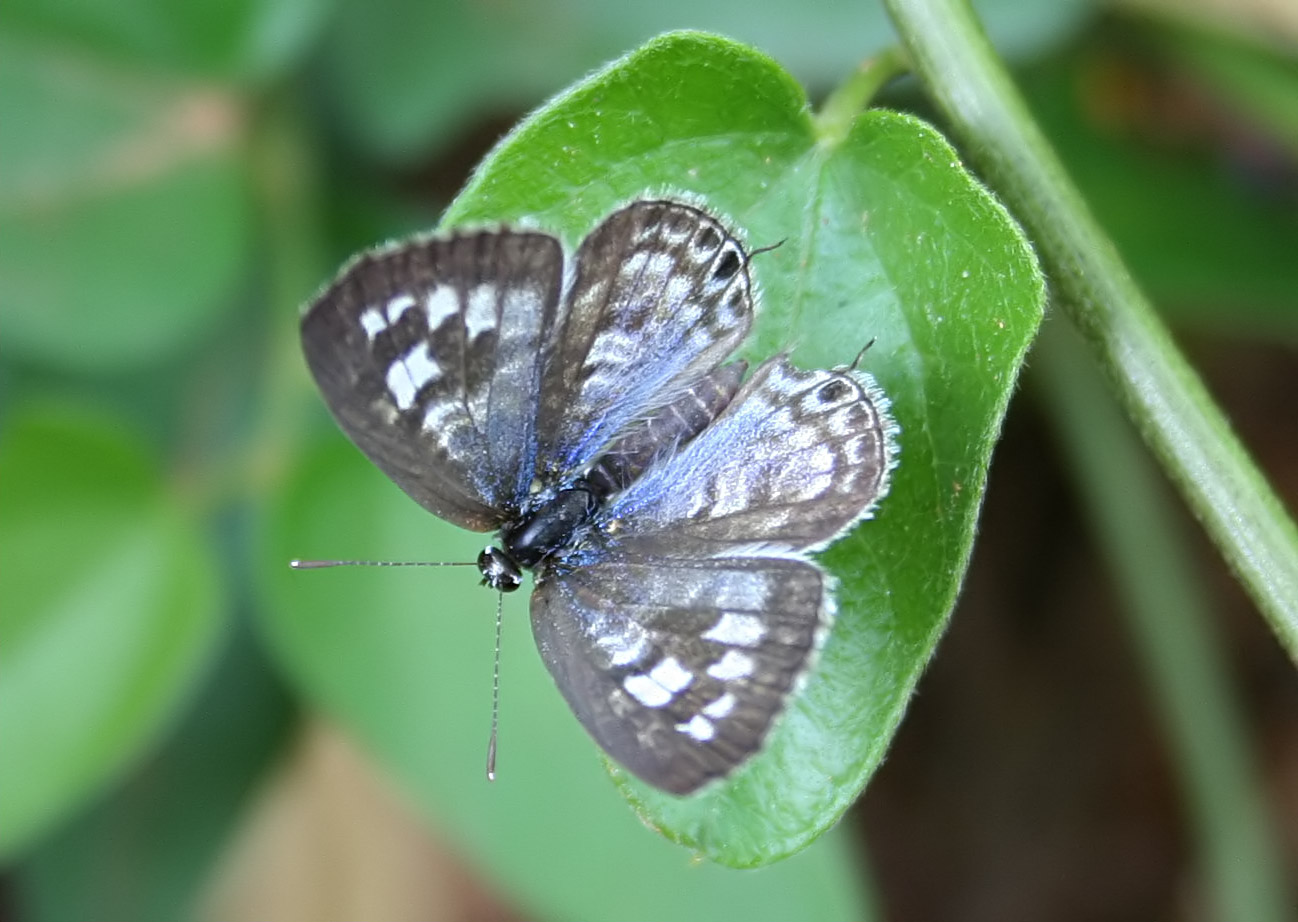
Opened wings of a female

This form closely resembles, in both sexes, on the upperside of Tarucus theophrastus, but the character and disposition of the markings on the underside are completely different.

In dry season Pune, India

Male upperside: dark violet with, in certain lights, a rich blue suffusion. Forewing: no discocellular black spot so conspicuous as in T. theophrastus; terminal margin with a narrow edging of fuscous black, widest at the apex, gradually decreasing to the tornus, followed by an inconspicuous anteciliary jet-black line. Hindwing: costal margin slightly but broadly shaded with fuscous, which is continued as a slender anteciliary black line to the tornus. Underside: white. Forewing: with the following brownish-black markings: an irregular edging along the costa to near the apex from which extends downwards a subbasal band, broadened across the cell and below it; an irregular band that extends along the discocellulars and below them to interspace 1 where it ends in a point; an upper discal curved band of more even width but dislocated below vein 4, the lower portion of it shifted inwards forms a large quadrate spot in interspace 3, below vein 3 the band is continued downwards by two small inconspicuous spots, beyond this is a very short acutely pointed comma-shaped mark; a very regular evenly curved complete transverse lunular line, a transverse series of subterminal spots and an anteciliary slender line. Close to the base of the wing extended obliquely upwards and outwards from the dorsum is a triangular mark, the edging of white colour left near the base forms above the apex of this mark an acute angle; between the band that crosses the middle of the cell and the transverse discocellular band is a more or less slender, irregular, similarly coloured line; and between the discocellular and upper discal bands another much shorter line that extends from the costa downwards but does not reach vein 4, this is slightly clavate anteriorly and posteriorly. Hindwing: mottled with brownish black that leaves only basal, subbasal, medial and discal transverse lines or bands of the ground colour; the medial and discal bands, which are highly irregular, enclose here and there small brownish markings, the bands themselves coalescing above a very irregularly shaped brown mark that is placed on the posterior half of the middle of the wing; terminal markings as on the forewing but the subterminal spots larger, the apical one especially so, the tornal two spots jet-black and each encircled by a glittering slender ring of metallic green scales. Cilia of both forewings and hindwings, the antennae, head, thorax and abdomen much as in T. theophrastus.

Female. Upperside very closely resembles that of female T. theophrastus, but the extent of white on the forewing is greater so that there is a greater area of white to be seen between the brown markings superposed on it, these markings have the appearance of an irregularly formed V on a white background. Hindwing much as in T. theophrastus. Underside: similar to that of its own male but the brown bands less broken, more regular. Cilia, antennae, head, thorax and abdomen as in the male.

It is found in the Ethiopian region, the north-western Himalayas to Kumaon, the plains of northern India; central and western India, Sri Lanka, Assam, Myanmar, Tenasserim in the low hot valleys of the north; extending to China and in the Malayan subregion to Java.

The description given above is taken from males and females of wet-season broods. Specimens of the dry-season broods are paler on the upperside with, in the male only anteciliary black lines to the wings. On the underside the markings on the wings will, on careful examination, be found very similar but paler brown and all very much reduced in width so that a greater extent of the white ground colour is visible.

== Life history ==
=== Food plants ===
Plants of the legume family, Plumbaginaceae and some of the citrus family Rutaceae. Species include Glycine tomentella, Dyerophytum indicum, Indigofera suffruticosa, Lablab purpureus, Plumbago zeylanica, Rhynchosia tomentosa, Sesbania bispinosa, Tephrosia obovata, Ziziphus mauritiana, Indigofera argentea, Indigofera erecta, Medicago sativa and Toddalia asiatica.

=== Larva ===
"Pale greenish yellow above, sides lilacine, a narrow brownish median line, followed by eight diagonal short streaks and six brownish-red spots. Before pupating the colouring gets much more diffused. Feeds among the flower-buds of Plumbago."

=== Pupa ===
"Dull yellowish profusely mottled with brown spots." (E. E. Green as quoted by Lionel de Nicéville.)

== Subspecies ==
- Leptotes plinius hyrcanus (Felder, 1860)
- Leptotes plinius juvenal (Fruhstorfer, 1922)
- Leptotes plinius leopardus (Schultze, 1910)
- Leptotes plinius lybas (Godart, [1824])
- Leptotes plinius manusi (Rothschild, 1915)
- Leptotes plinius pseudocassius (Murray, 1873)
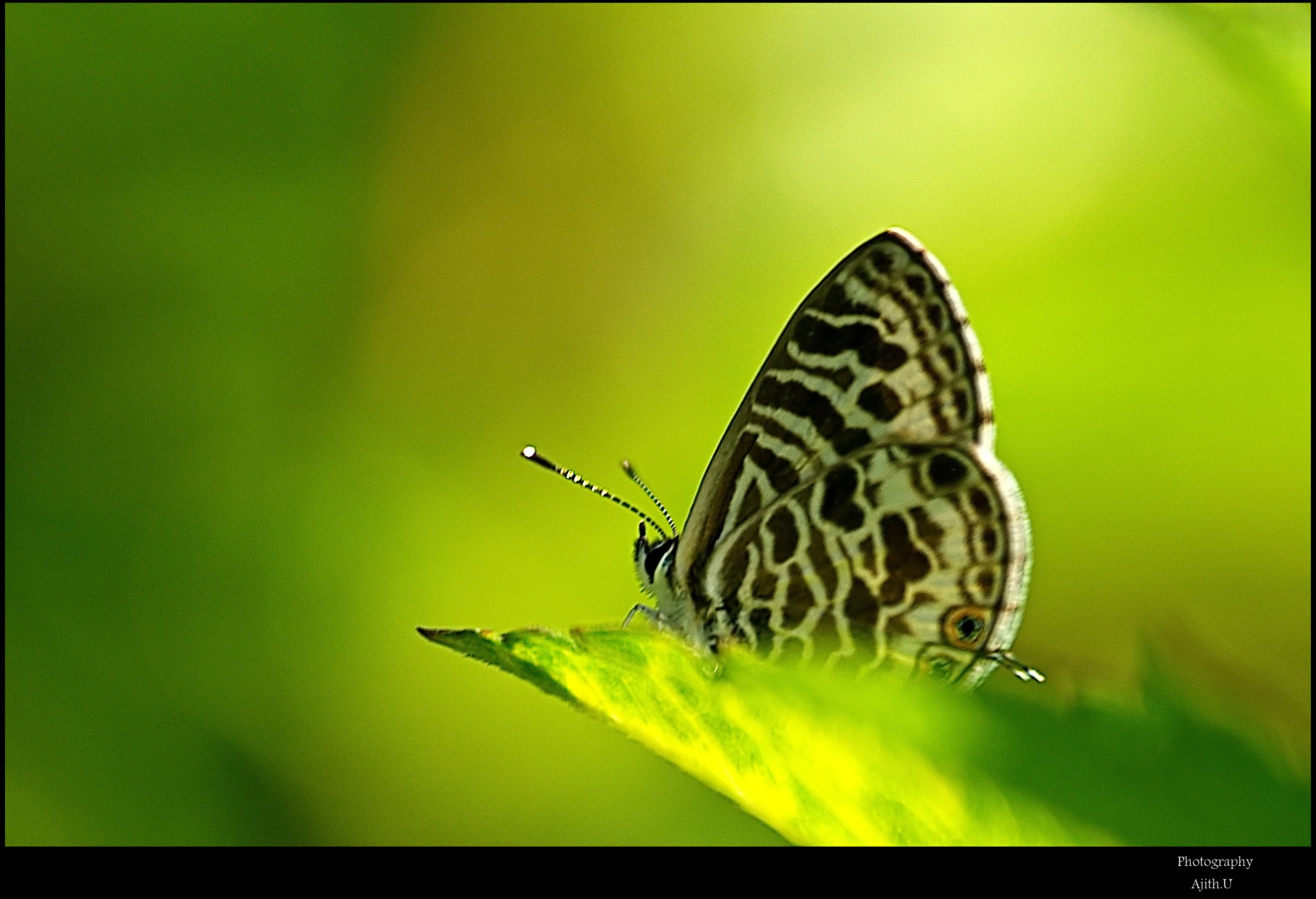
From Bangalore, India

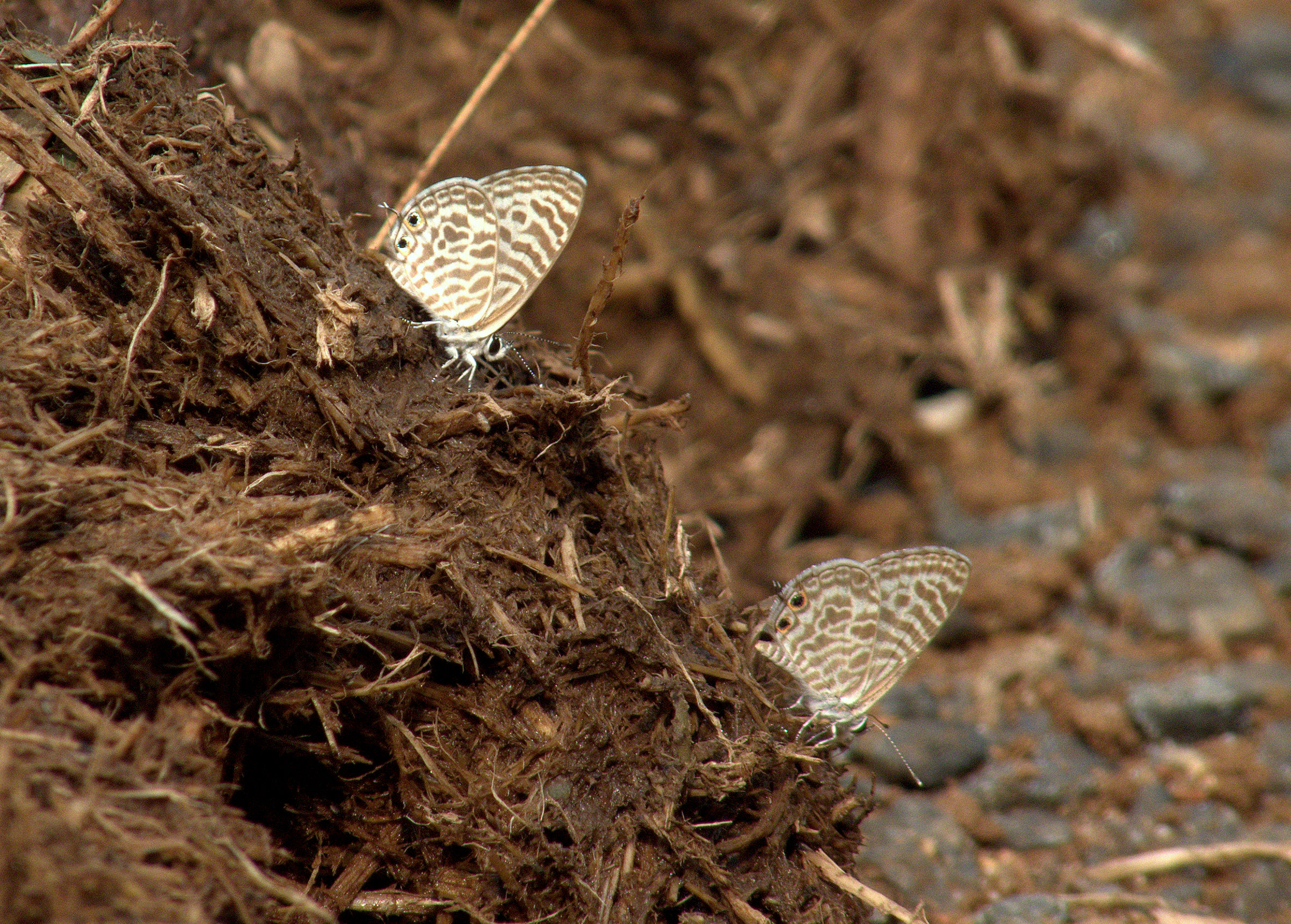
Zebra blue butterflies on elephant dung Tamil Nadu, India

== Other references ==
- Evans, W. H. (1932). The Identification of Indian Butterflies (2nd ed.). Mumbai, India: Bombay Natural History Society.
- Gaonkar, Harish (1996). Butterflies of the Western Ghats, India (including Sri Lanka) - A Biodiversity Assessment of a Threatened Mountain System. Bangalore, India: Centre for Ecological Sciences.
- Gay, Thomas; Kehimkar, Isaac David; Punetha, Jagdish Chandra (1992). Common Butterflies of India. Nature Guides. Bombay, India: World Wide Fund for Nature-India by Oxford University Press. ISBN 978-0195631647.
- Haribal, Meena (1992). The Butterflies of Sikkim Himalaya and Their Natural History. Gangtok, Sikkim, India: Sikkim Nature Conservation Foundation.
- Kunte, Krushnamegh (2000). Butterflies of Peninsular India. India, A Lifescape. Hyderabad, India: Universities Press. ISBN 978-8173713545.
- Wynter-Blyth, Mark Alexander (1957). Butterflies of the Indian Region. Bombay, India: Bombay Natural History Society. ISBN 978-8170192329.
