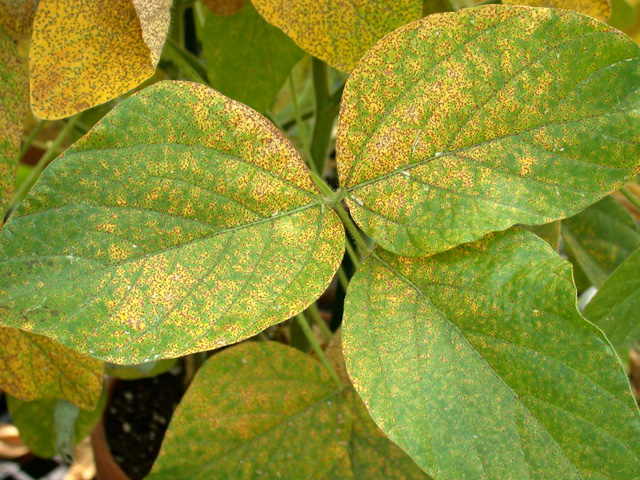
- Soybean leaves infected with soybean rust, uredinia are visible

Scientific classification
- Kingdom: Fungi
- Division: Basidiomycota
- Class: Pucciniomycetes
- Order: Pucciniales
- Family: Phakopsoraceae
- Genus: Phakopsora

Groups included
- Phakopsora meibomiae - New World soybean rust; Phakopsora pachyrhizi - Asian soybean rust

Cladistically included but traditionally excluded taxa
- All other Phakopsora species

= Soybean rust =

Disease affecting soybeans and other legumes

Soybean rust is a disease that affects soybeans and other legumes. It is caused by two types of fungi, Phakopsora pachyrhizi, commonly known as Asian soybean rust, and Phakopsora meibomiae, commonly known as New World soybean rust. P. meibomiae is the weaker pathogen of the two and generally does not cause widespread problems. The disease has been reported across Asia, Australia, Africa, South America and the United States.

== Importance ==
Soybean is one of the most important commercial crops around the world. Asian soybean rust is the major disease that affects soybeans. It causes lesions on the leaves of soybean plants and eventually kills the plants. The disease has caused serious yield loss of soybeans. In the areas where this disease is common, the yield losses can be up to 80%. The first reported cases in the United States occurred in 2004. This population originated in northern South America or the Caribbean. The spores were most likely spread by Hurricane Ivan. In 2002, USDA reported 10-60% yield losses in South America and Africa. in countries where this pathogen is established, estimated losses are between 10 and 80% depending on the inoculation and environmental conditions.

== Host and symptoms ==
Soybean rust is caused by two types of fungi, Phakopsora pachyrhizi and Phakopsora meibomiae. It affects several important commercial plants, however, most notable for soybeans. Asian Soybean Rust can infect and reproduce on 90 known plant species, 20 of which are found in the United States, such as, soybeans, dry beans, kidney beans, peas. Asian soybean rust also infects yellow sweet lover, vetch, medic, lupine, green and kidney bean, and lima and butter bean. leguminous forage crops such as trefoil and sweet clover and weeds such as kudzu.

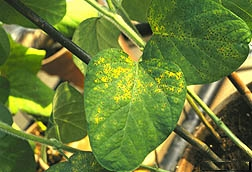
Soybean leaves infected with ASR (photo from USDA)

At the early stage of Asian Soybean Rust, it causes yellow mosaic discoloration on the upper surfaces of older foliage. At this stage, it is usually hard to identify since the symptoms are relatively small and poorly defined.

Later as the disease continues to progress, the leaves will turn yellow and there will be lesions mostly on the undersides of the leaves and sometimes on petioles, stems or pods and premature defoliation can also be observed. In Phakopsora pachyrhizi will begin to form small brown and brick red sports on the lower canopy of the leaves that will begin to turn into lesions.

Asian Soybean Rust produces two types of lesions. Lesions at the later stage will turn from gray to tan or reddish brown. Mature tan lesions consist of small pustules surrounded by discolored necrotic areas. Tan spores can be found at the necrotic areas on the underside of the leaf. In the case of reddish brown lesions, there are larger reddish brown necrotic areas with few pustules and visible spores on the underside of the leaf. A good way to distinguish Asian Soybean Rust from other diseases is to look at the pustules it produces. ASR pustules usually do not have the yellow halo which is typical of bacterial pustules. Besides, ASR pustules are raised and can be commonly found on the underside of the leaf which makes it different from the lesions caused by spot diseases.

Soybean plants are one of ASR's most known hosts and are susceptible at any stage in the life cycle. However, symptoms are most commonly found during or after flowering. ASR infection will reduce pod production and fill.

== Environment ==
Asian Soybean Rust (ASR) was first detected in Asia. It has been found in many countries around the world since then. For example, Australia, China, Korea, India, Japan, Nepal, Taiwan, Thailand, the Philippines, Mozambique, Nigeria, Rwanda, Uganda, Zimbabwe, South Africa, Brazil, Argentina, and Paraguay. This disease was first detected in the Caribbean in Puerto Rico in 1976 and first reported in the continental United States in 2004.

Asian Soybean Rust favors environments that are humid and warm. A continuous period of wetness on leaves will aid the growth of this disease since this situation is required for spores to germinate. Therefore, is most likely to appear under conditions of 60 to 85 °F (16 to 29 °C) and a relative humidity of 75% to 80%. Therefore, ASR is a more serious problem in tropical and subtropical areas in Asia, Africa, Australia and South America. It is unable to survive the cold winters of northern habitats. However, this pathogen can be spread easily from wind and storm fronts and can inoculate quickly within a soybean field under favorable environmental conditions. And the Asian Soybean Rust may be favored by the climatic anomalies phenomena that cause extreme rainfall natural disasters that is called El Niño.

== Disease cycle ==
Soybean rust is spread by windblown spores and has caused significant crop losses in many soybean-growing regions of the world. Windblown spores can travel for great distances and are released in cycles of seven days to two weeks. It is likely that ASR will survive on vast acreages of naturalized kudzu in the southern U.S. and thereby establish a permanent presence in the continental U.S. It is commonly believed that the disease was carried from Venezuela to the United States by Hurricane Ivan.

P. pachyrhizi is an obligate parasite, meaning that it must have live, green tissue to survive. For this reason ASR is something that will blow in every year, as cold winters will push it back. It can overwinter in southern states, so long as it has a living host.

ASR overwinters on live host legumes and sporulates the following spring. It cannot survive on dead tissue or crop residues.

Additional hosts can serve as overwintering reservoirs for the pathogen and allow for build-up of inoculum, in those environs free from freezing temperatures. The pathogen is well adapted for long-distance dispersal, because spores can be readily carried long distances by the wind to new, rust-free regions.

Overwintering sites of soybean rust are restricted to areas with very mild winters, such as the gulf coasts of Florida, the very southernmost areas of Texas, or in Mexico. Soybean rust will not survive over the winter in the North Central region because it can't live and reproduce without green living tissue.

Spores of the soybean rust pathogen are transported readily by air currents and can be carried hundreds of miles in a few days. Weather conditions will determine when and where the spores travel from south to north.

Rust spores, called urediniospores, are able to penetrate the plant cells directly, rather than through natural openings or through wounds in the leaf tissue. Thus infection is relatively quick: about 9 to 10 days from initial infection to the next cycle of spore production.

Rust is a multi-cyclic disease. After the initial infection is established, the infection site can produce spores for 10 to 14 days. Abundant spore production occurs during wet leaf periods (in the form of rain or dew) of at least 8 hours and moderate temperatures of 60 to 80 °F (16 to 27 °C).

=== The process ===
The infection process starts when urediniospores germinate to produce a single germ tube that grows across the leaf surface, until an appressorium forms. Appressoria form over anticlinal walls or over the center of epidermal cells, but rarely over stomata. Penetration of epidermal cells is by direct penetration through the cuticle by an appressorial peg. When appressoria form over stomata, the hyphae penetrate one of the guard cells rather than entering the leaf through the stomatal opening. This rust and related species are unique in their ability to directly penetrate the epidermis; most rust pathogens enter the leaf through stomatal openings and penetrate cells once inside the leaf. The direct penetration of the epidermal cells and the non-specific induction of appressoria in the infection process of P. pachyrhizi may aid in understanding the broad host range of the pathogen and may have consequences in the development of resistant cultivars.

Uredinia can develop 5 to 8 days after infection by urediniospores. The first urediniospores can be produced as early as 9 days after infection, and spore production can continue for up to 3 weeks. Uredinia may develop for up to 4 weeks after a single inoculation, and secondary uredinia will arise on the margins of the initial infections for an additional 8 weeks. Thus, from an initial infection, there could be first generation pustules that maintain sporulation for up to 15 weeks. Even under dry conditions this extended sporulation capacity allows the pathogen to persist and remain a threat. If conditions for re-infection are sporadic throughout the season, significant inoculum potential still remains from the initial infection to reestablish an epidemic. Successful infection is dependent on the availability of moisture on plant surfaces. At least 6 hours of free moisture is needed for infection with maximum infections occurring with 10 to 12 hours of free moisture. Temperatures between 15 and 28 °C (59 and 82 °F) are ideal for infection.

== Management and control ==
Disease control options for ASR are limited. Rust descends in clouds of spores across the countryside. Cultural practices such as row spacing and crop rotations have little effect. Resistant cultivars do exist, carrying what are called Rpp genes. When weather and disease infection conditions are favorable, the occurrence of ASR can be widespread. Thus, remedial control measures—using fungicides as protective sprays—are the main effective disease control method. Soybean rust must be managed as early in the growing season as possible to be managed successfully.

Synthetic fungicides are the primary disease control option for protection against Asian soybean rust. The cost of spraying is estimated to be about $15 to $20 per acre; however, two or three sprays may be needed over the course of the growing season. These are significant additional production costs for soybean growers.

Fungicide screening trials to determine disease control efficacy have been field conducted in South America and South Africa. These reports are available on the Web through USDA's Integrated Pest Management Information Centers. These research trials form the basis for fungicidal recommendations in the U.S.

Recent research from Washington State University indicates that the herbicide Glyphosate may be effective in dealing with the fungus.

Rust-resistant varieties of soybeans are currently in development by both public universities and private industry.

In some regions, the selection of winter cover crops and forage legumes may be effected, since they can serve as host plants. Resistance genes (Rpps) have been identified and host resistance is expected to be an effective, long-term solution for soybean rust in the future. Until resistant commercial varieties are in place, the management of rust depends on judicious use of fungicides.

When untreated, soybean rust causes yield losses due to premature defoliation, fewer seeds per pod and decreased number of filled pods per plant.

== See also ==
- Rust (fungus)
- Phakopsora gossypii also known as cotton rust
- Soybean dwarf virus
