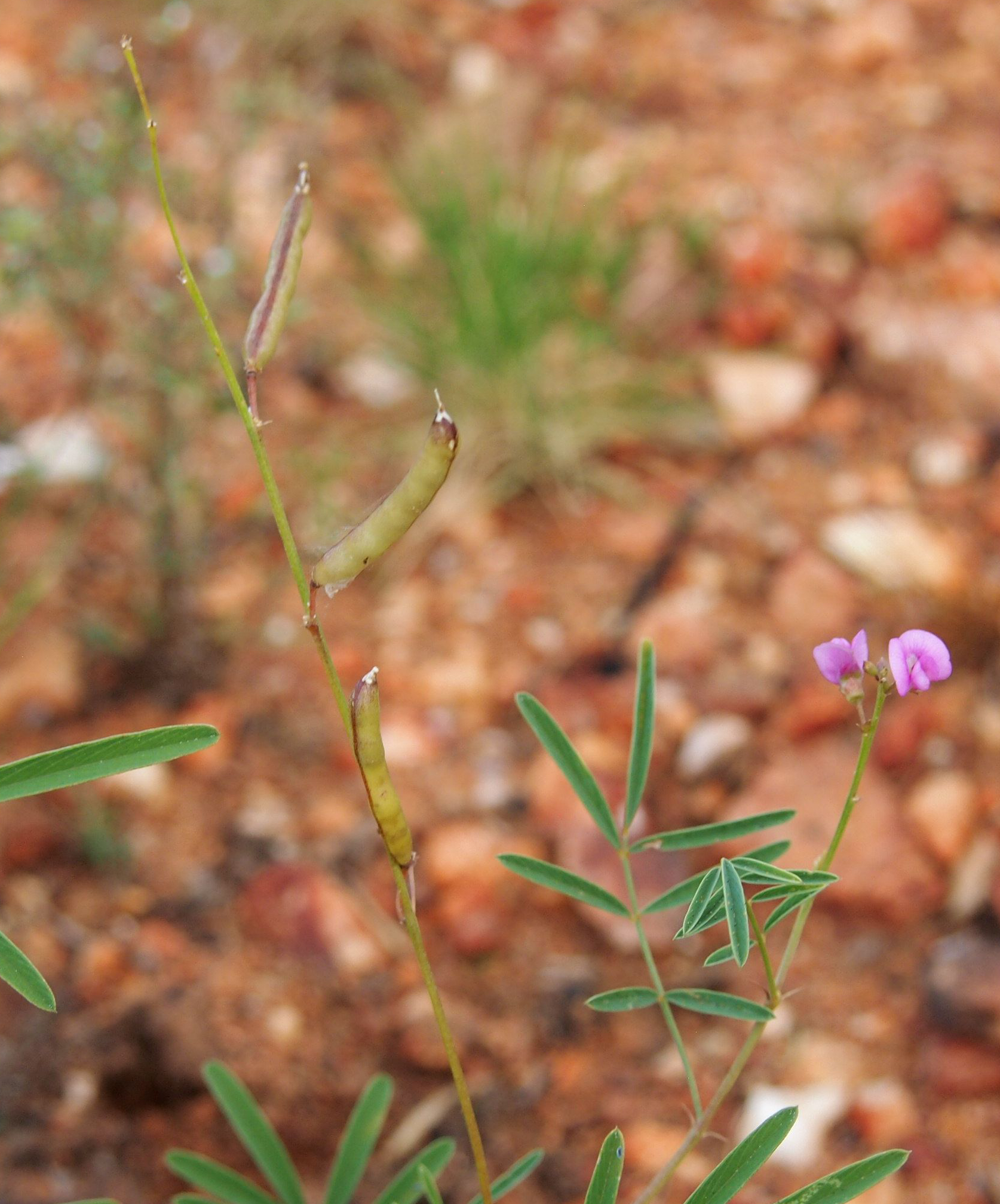

Conservation status
- Least Concern (IUCN 3.1)
- Critically Endangered (FFG Act 1988)

Scientific classification
- Kingdom: Plantae
- Clade: Tracheophytes
- Clade: Angiosperms
- Clade: Eudicots
- Clade: Rosids
- Order: Fabales
- Family: Fabaceae
- Subfamily: Faboideae
- Genus: Glycine
- Subgenus: Glycine subg. Glycine
- Species: G. canescens

Binomial name
- Glycine canescens F.J.Herm.
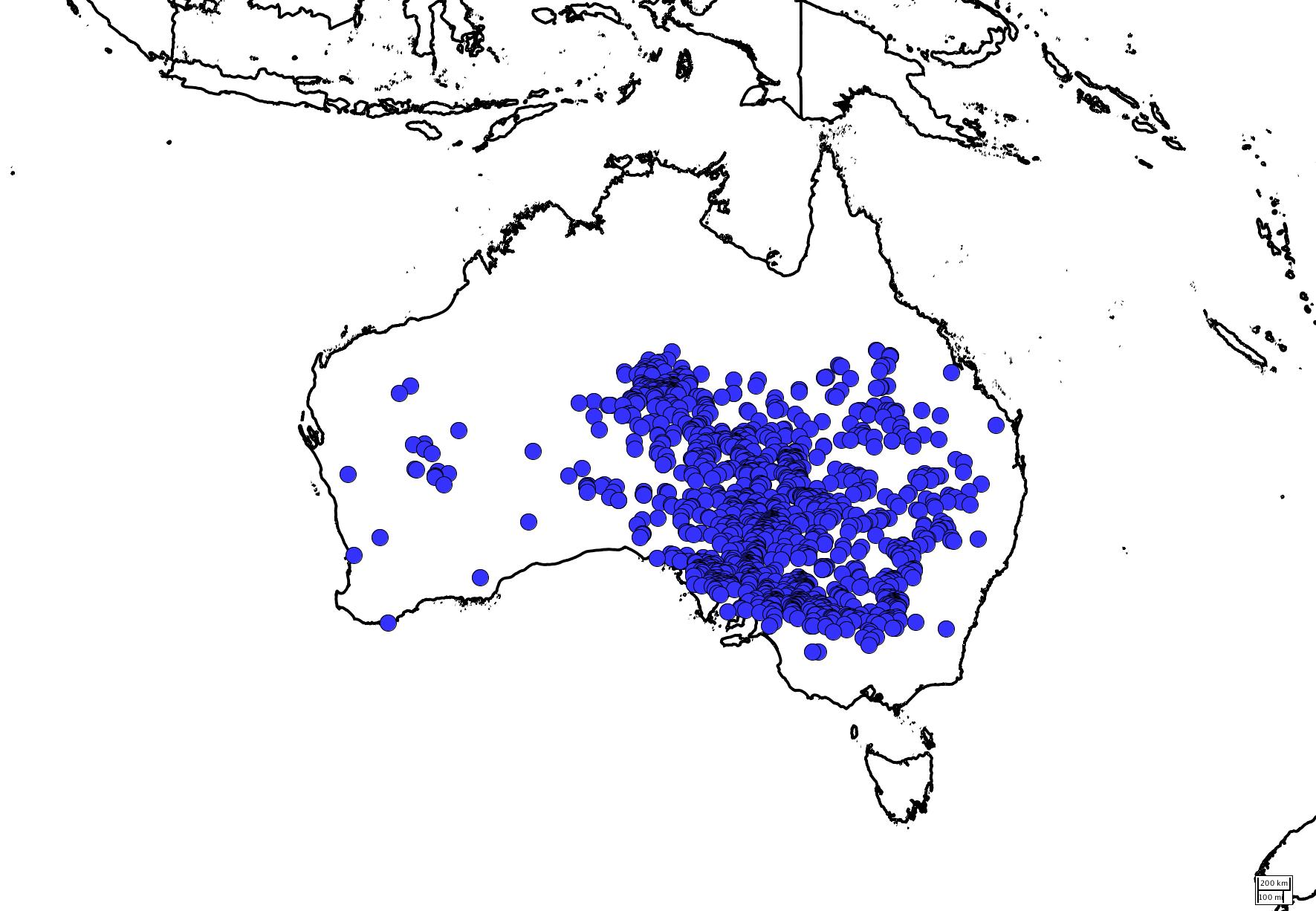

Synonyms
- Glycine sericea (F.Muell.) Benth.; Glycine sericea var. orthotricha J.M.Black; Leptocyamus sericeus F.Muell.

= Glycine canescens =

Species of soybean native to Australia

Glycine canescens, common name silky glycine, is a trailing or twining herb. It is a species of soybean native to Australia. A perennial living across the Outback in extremely hot and dry conditions, it is being studied for its potential to improve the cultivated soybean (Glycine max). It grows in sandy or stony soils in a variety of habitats.

== Etymology and Naming ==
Glycine is from Greek glykys, meaning sweet, possibly referring to the sweetness of the tubers in the genus Apios, which was previously included in Glycine.

== Threat Status ==
The plant is Critically Endangered (CR) and considered to be facing an extremely high risk of extinction in the wild, according to the Victorian Flora and Fauna Guarantee Act 1988.

However, a 15 July 2010 the IUCN Red List assessment of threatened species placed the species at Least Concern.

== Description ==
The plant is entirely covered in stiff hairs or bristles. Stems are extended, generally trailing or twining. Leaves are on stalks called petioles 3 to 20mm long. The end leaf or terminal leaflet is on a stalk 1 to 8mm long. Side leaves or lateral leaflets are attached, having a very small stalk or no stalk. The layer of the leaf is long and thin with a uniform cross section. The leaf shape can be widest in the middle or elliptic, and narrowing to being long and pointed or lanceolate, with the tip or apex of the leaf to a short point.

The flowers or inflorescence are borne along a main stem, with the oldest flowers at the base. 6 to 12 flowers are on long slender stalks or peduncles, 3 to 7mm long. Single flowers 7 to 9mm long on a small stalk 1 to 2mm long, and arranged loosely on an elongated central axis. Flowers year long.

Seed pods measure 20 to 35mm long, 3 to 4 mm wide, and holding 5 to 7 seeds 3mm by 2.5mm. Pods can be smooth and shining, black or mottled.

== Ecology ==
The native range of Glycine canescens is Australia. It is widespread across the states of: NSW, Qld, Vic, S.A, and N.T. It is a scrambling perennial and grows primarily in the desert or dry shrubland biome, mainly inland districts.

It is reported to be a good fodder, and flowering all year round especially July-Aug.

== Taxonomy ==
Taxonomy represents a formal structure of classes or types of objects within a knowledge domain by using a controlled vocabulary to make it easier to find related information.

The description was published by US Botanist Dr Frederick Joseph Hermann (1906-1987) in 1962. The Technical Bulletin number 1268 A Revision of the Genus Glycine and its Immediate Allies for the United States Department of Agriculture.
