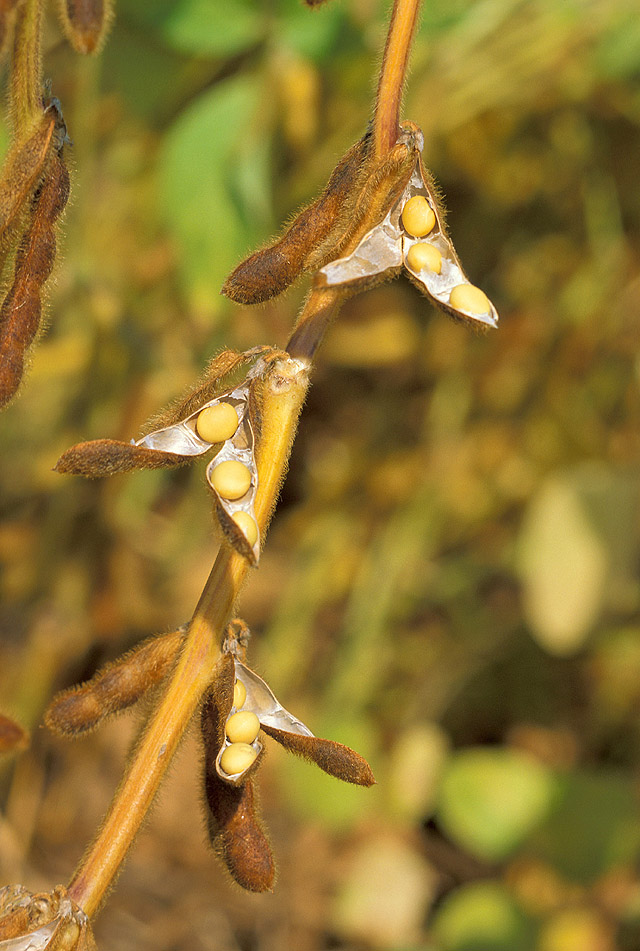
- Glycine max: soybeans

Scientific classification
- Kingdom: Plantae
- Clade: Tracheophytes
- Clade: Angiosperms
- Clade: Eudicots
- Clade: Rosids
- Order: Fabales
- Family: Fabaceae
- Subfamily: Faboideae
- Clade: Millettioids
- Tribe: Phaseoleae
- Subtribe: Glycininae
- Genus: Glycine; Willd. (1802), nom. cons.

Type species
- Glycine clandestina J.C. Wendl.

Species
- See text

Synonyms
- Cadelium Medik. (1787); Chrystolia Montrouz. ex Beauvis. (1901); Kennedynella Steud. (1840), nom. superfl.; Leptocyamus Benth. (1839); Leptolobium Benth. (1837), nom. illeg.; Soja Moench (1794), nom. rej.; Triendilix Raf. (1836)

= Glycine (plant) =

Genus of legumes

Glycine is a genus in the bean family Fabaceae. The best known species is the cultivated soybean (Glycine max). While the majority of the species are found only in Australia, the soybean's native range is in East Asia. A few species extend from Australia to East Asia (e.g., G. tomentella and G. tabacina). Glycine species are used as food plants by the larvae of some Lepidoptera species: the engrailed, nutmeg and turnip moths have all been recorded on soybean.

== Taxonomy ==
The genus name Glycine has had a tangled taxonomic history. It was first introduced by Carl Linnaeus in 1753. Linnaeus listed eight species. The first was Glycine apios, for which he gave the pre-Linnaean synonym "Apios americana". The genus name is derived from the Greek glykys, meaning 'sweet'. Linnaeus's Glycine apios, now accepted as Apios americana, has edible roots, which were used as food by Native Americans in the United States. In 1966, Bernard Verdcourt discovered that the designated type species of Linnaeus's genus, Glycine javanica, was actually a member of the genus Pueraria with an abnormal inflorescence. Linnaeus's eight species are now placed in seven genera other than Glycine. Verdcourt proposed that since Linnaeus's Glycine was so confused, the genus should instead be based on the species Glycine clandestina, first described by Carl Ludwig Willdenow in 1802. The proposal was agreed in 1978, and Glycine L. is a rejected name in favour of the conserved name Glycine Willd. A consequence of the changes is that the justification for the genus name no longer exists, since none of the species with edible roots are now placed in Glycine.

=== Species ===
As of February 2025, Plants of the World Online accepted 28 species.

Subgenus Glycine

- Glycine albicans Tindale & Craven
- Glycine aphyonotos B.E.Pfeil
- Glycine arenaria Tindale
- Glycine argyrea Tindale
- Glycine canescens F.J.Herm.
- Glycine clandestina J.C.Wendl.
- Glycine curvata Tindale
- Glycine cyrtoloba Tindale
- Glycine dolichocarpa Tateishi & H.Ohashi
- Glycine falcata Benth.
- Glycine gracei B.E.Pfeil & Craven
- Glycine hirticaulis Tindale & Craven
- Glycine koidzumii Ohwi
- Glycine lactovirens Tindale & Craven
- Glycine latifolia (Benth.) C.Newell & Hymowitz
- Glycine latrobeana (Meissner) Benth.
- Glycine microphylla (Benth.) Tindale
- Glycine montis-douglas B.E.Pfeil & Craven
- Glycine peratosa B.E.Pfeil & Tindale
- Glycine pescadrensis Hayata
- Glycine pindanica Tindale & Craven
- Glycine pullenii B.E.Pfeil, Tindale & Craven
- Glycine remota M.D.Barrett & R.L.Barrett
- Glycine rubiginosa Tindale & B.E.Pfeil
- Glycine stenophita B.E.Pfeil & Tindale
- Glycine syndetika B.E.Pfeil & Craven
- Glycine tabacina (Labill.) Benth.
- Glycine tomentella Hayata

Subgenus Soja (Moench) F.J. Herm.

- Glycine max (L.) Merr. (the soybean)
- Glycine soja Sieb. & Zucc.
