= Glycine latifolia =

Scientific classification
- Kingdom: Plantae
- Clade: Tracheophytes
- Clade: Angiosperms
- Clade: Eudicots
- Clade: Rosids
- Order: Fabales
- Family: Fabaceae
- Subfamily: Faboideae
- Genus: Glycine
- Subgenus: Glycine subg. Glycine
- Species: G. latifolia

Binomial name
- Glycine latifolia (Benth.) Newell & T.Hymowitz

Synonyms
- Glycine tabacina var. latifolia (Benth.) Benth.; Leptocyamus latifolius Benth.

Species of plant native to Australia

Glycine latifolia is a species of flowering plant in the family Fabaceae, native to Queensland and New South Wales in Australia. A perennial, it is a crop wild relative of soybean (Glycine max), and shows resistance to a number of pathogens that afflict soybeans.
