= Cerotelium =

Scientific classification
- Kingdom: Fungi
- Division: Basidiomycota
- Class: Pucciniomycetes
- Order: Pucciniales
- Family: Phakopsoraceae
- Genus: Cerotelium; Arthur (1906)

Species
- See text.

Genus of fungi

Cerotelium is a genus of fungi in the family Phakopsoraceae. As of September 2026, it contains 29 accepted species.

== Species ==
- Cerotelium ageratinae C. Mohanan
- Cerotelium allaeanthi Syd.
- Cerotelium asari S. Kaneko, Katum. & Hirats. f.
- Cerotelium bauhiniae Thirum. & Yadav
- Cerotelium butlerianum Sawada
- Cerotelium canavaliae Arthur
- Cerotelium clemensiae Syd.
- Cerotelium combreti Cummins
- Cerotelium concinnum Syd.
- Cerotelium corchori Syd.
- Cerotelium daedaloides Cummins
- Cerotelium deightonii Cummins
- Cerotelium dioscoreae Berndt
- Cerotelium diospyri Beenken
- Cerotelium fici (Castagne) Arthur
- Cerotelium galactiae Salazar-Yepes & A.A. Carvalho
- Cerotelium giacomettii Dianese, L.T.P. Santos & R.B. Medeiros
- Cerotelium kirganeliae Thirum. & Yadav
- Cerotelium lanneae (Höhn.) Arthur
- Cerotelium malvicola (Speg.) Dietel
- Cerotelium morobeanum Cummins
- Cerotelium peregrinum (Syd., P. Syd. & E.J. Butler) Arthur
- Cerotelium premnae C. Mohanan
- Cerotelium proximellum Syd.
- Cerotelium spondiadis (Petch) Arthur
- Cerotelium strychni C. Mohanan
- Cerotelium terminaliae-paniculatae Nag Raj, Govindu & Thirum.
- Cerotelium trichosanthis (Petch) Nag Raj, Govindu & Thirum.
- Cerotelium wagateae Thirum. & Gopalkr.
