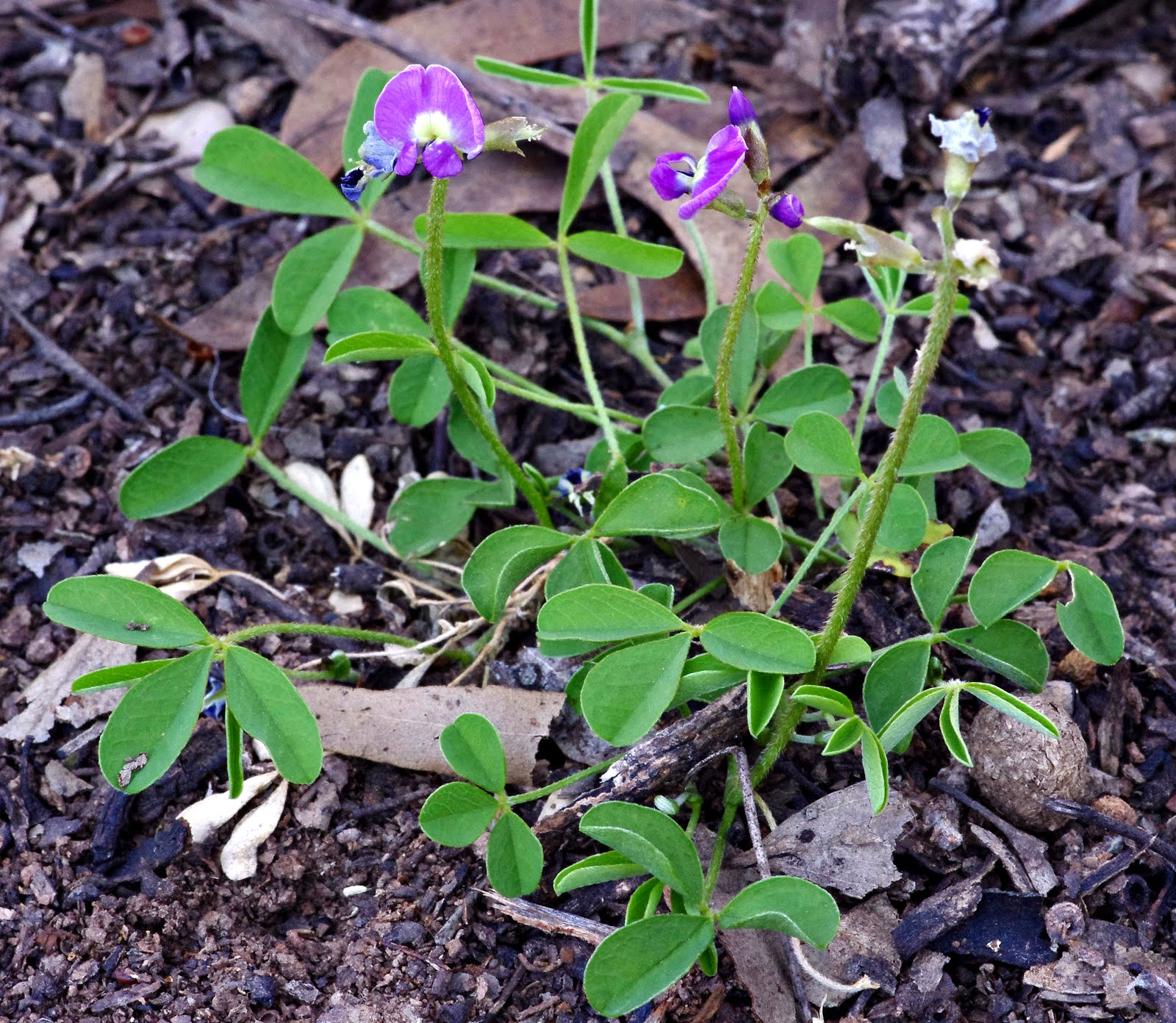

Conservation status
- Vulnerable (EPBC Act)

Scientific classification
- Kingdom: Plantae
- Clade: Tracheophytes
- Clade: Angiosperms
- Clade: Eudicots
- Clade: Rosids
- Order: Fabales
- Family: Fabaceae
- Subfamily: Faboideae
- Genus: Glycine
- Subgenus: Glycine subg. Glycine
- Species: G. latrobeana

Binomial name
- Glycine latrobeana (Meisn.) Benth. (1864)

= Glycine latrobeana =

Species of plant

Glycine latrobeana, the clover glycine or Australian anchor plant, is a species of perennial herb endemic to south-eastern Australia. Its leaves are similar in appearance to the common pasture clover. It is native to Tasmania, Victoria, New South Wales and South Australia.
