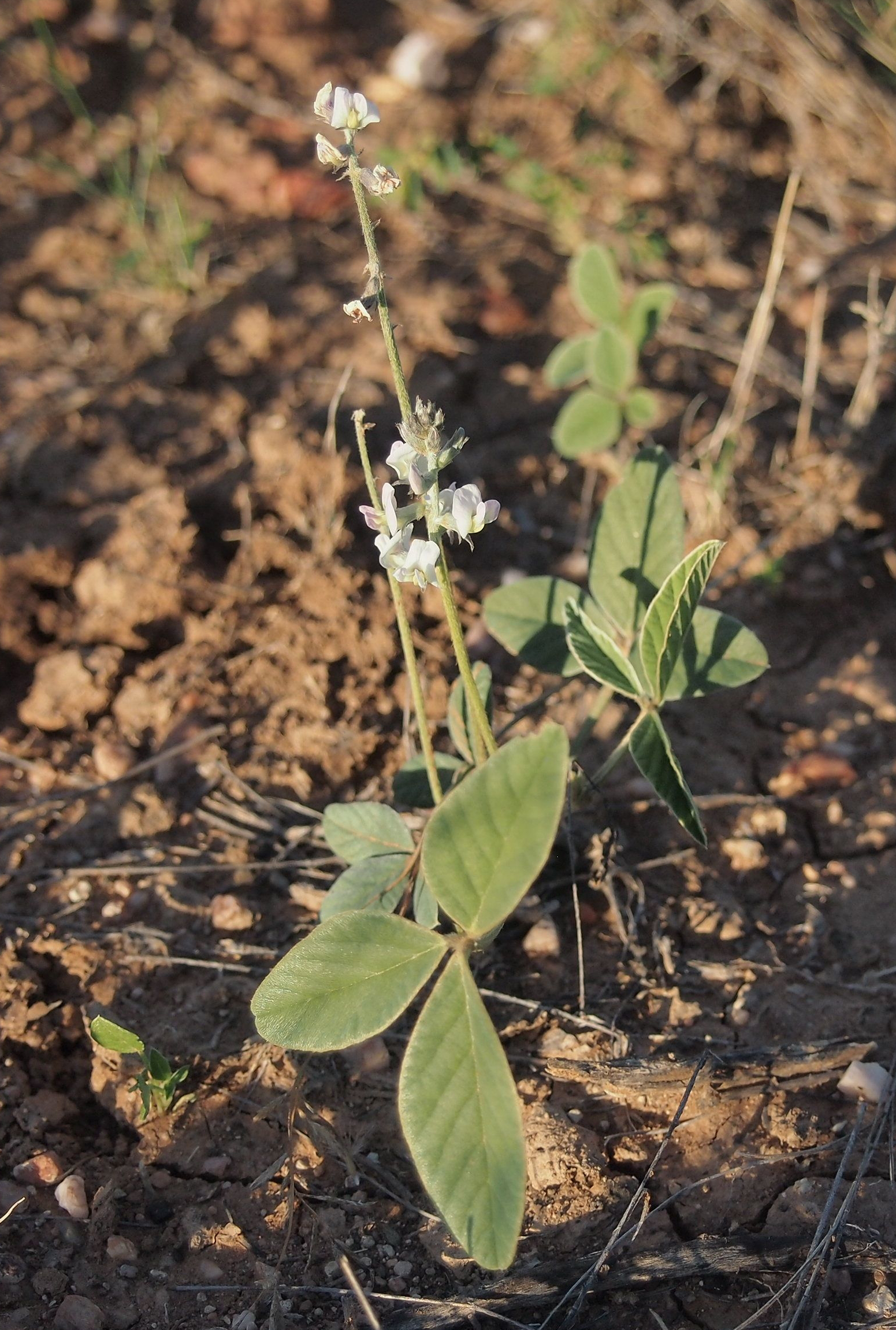

Scientific classification
- Kingdom: Plantae
- Clade: Tracheophytes
- Clade: Angiosperms
- Clade: Eudicots
- Clade: Rosids
- Order: Fabales
- Family: Fabaceae
- Subfamily: Faboideae
- Genus: Glycine
- Species: G. falcata

Binomial name
- Glycine falcata Benth.

= Glycine falcata =

Species of flowering plant

Glycine falcata is a species of flowering plant in the family Fabaceae. The native range is the majority of Australia and occurs in regions such as Western Australia, Northern Territory, Queensland and South Australia.
