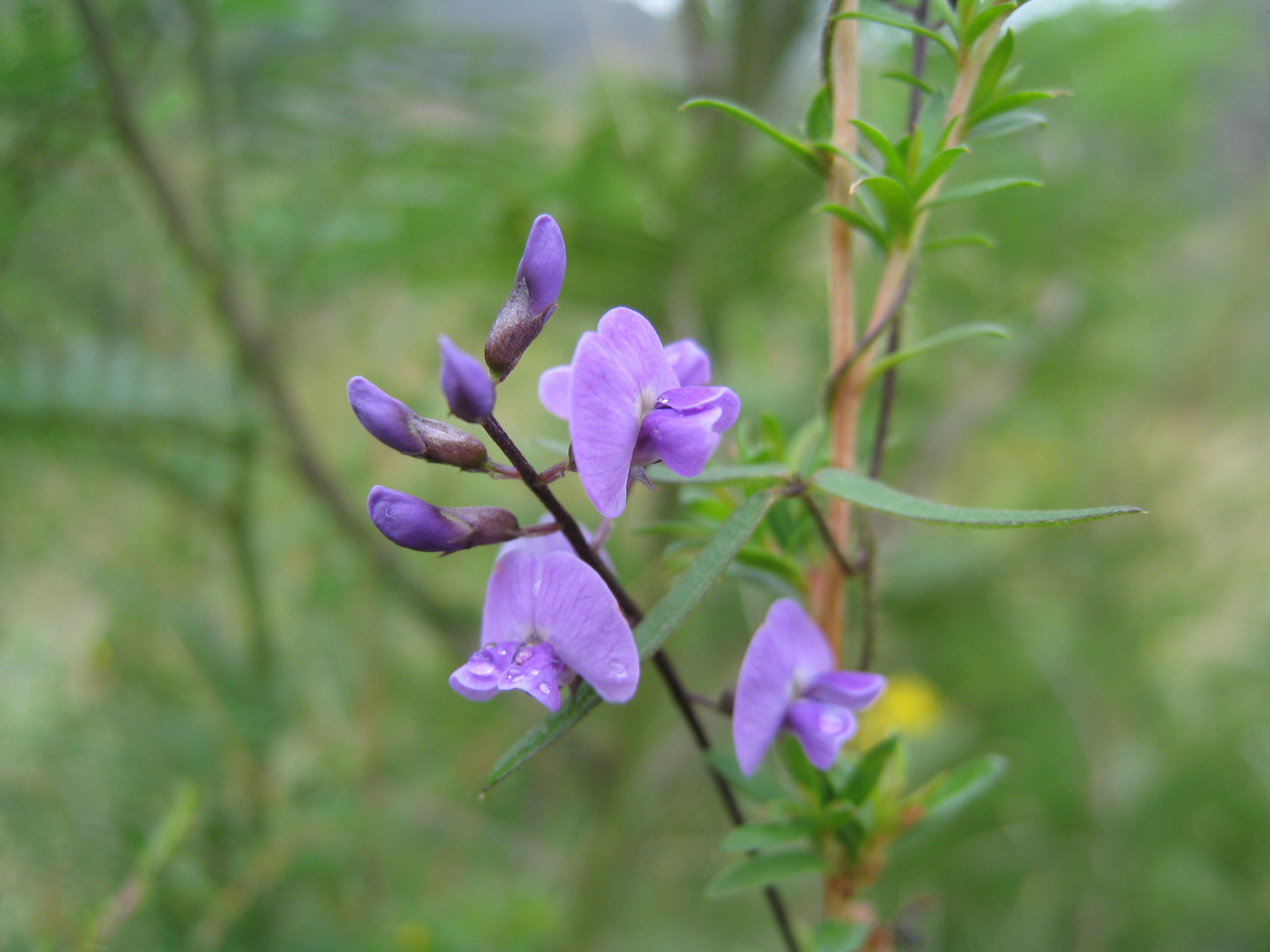

Scientific classification
- Kingdom: Plantae
- Clade: Tracheophytes
- Clade: Angiosperms
- Clade: Eudicots
- Clade: Rosids
- Order: Fabales
- Family: Fabaceae
- Subfamily: Faboideae
- Genus: Glycine
- Subgenus: Glycine subg. Glycine
- Species: G. clandestina

Binomial name
- Glycine clandestina J.C.Wendl.

= Glycine clandestina =

Twining glycine

Species of plant

Glycine clandestina commonly known as twining glycine, is a flowering plant in the family Fabaceae. It has green leaves with three leaflets, mauve pea flowers and grows in Tasmania and eastern states of Australia.

== Description ==
Glycine clandestina is a slender, twining climber, stems up to 50 cm (20 in) long covered in soft hairs, winding over grasses and taller shrubs. Leaves consist of three, variable sized, linear-shaped leaflets, 12–50 mm (0.47–1.97 in) long, 2–8 mm (0.079–0.315 in) wide and occasional appressed hairs, apex rounded or pointed. Flowers are borne in leaf axils on long stalks, mauve, pale blue or pink, pea-shaped, petals to 1 cm (0.39 in) long. Flowering may occur anytime of the year and fruit is an oblong, straight, flattened pod with short hairs, up to 4 cm (1.6 in) long and 2.5–4 mm (0.098–0.157 in) wide containing 4-12 seeds.

== Taxonomy and naming ==
Glycine clandestina was first formally described in 1798 by Johann Christoph Wendland and the description was published in Botanische Beobachtungen: nebst einigen neuen Gattungen und Arten.The specific epithet (clandestina) means "concealed, hidden".

== Distribution and habitat ==
Twining glycine grows in woodland, forests and ranges in New South Wales, Victoria, Queensland, South Australia and Tasmania.
