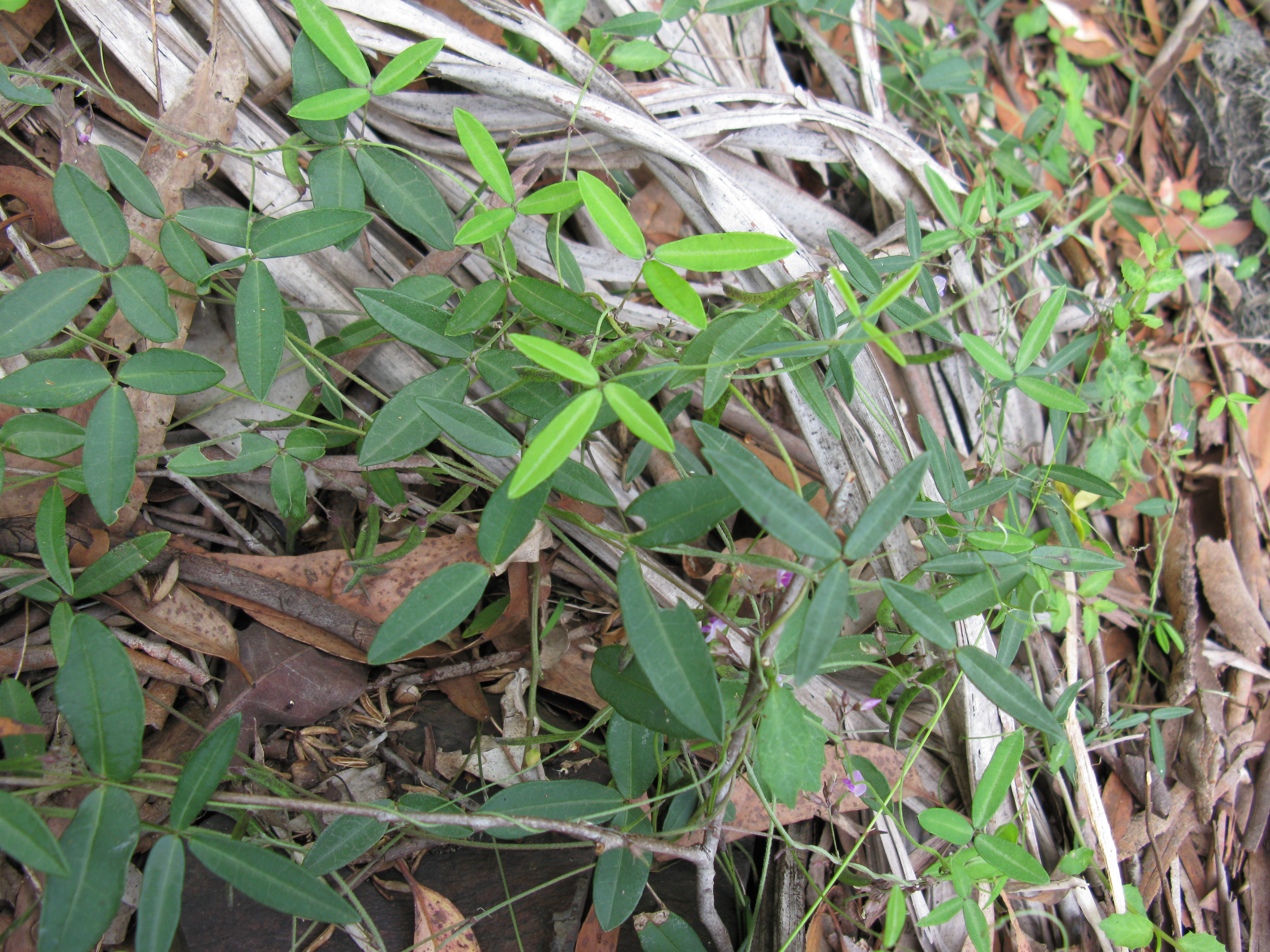
- Old and young leaves
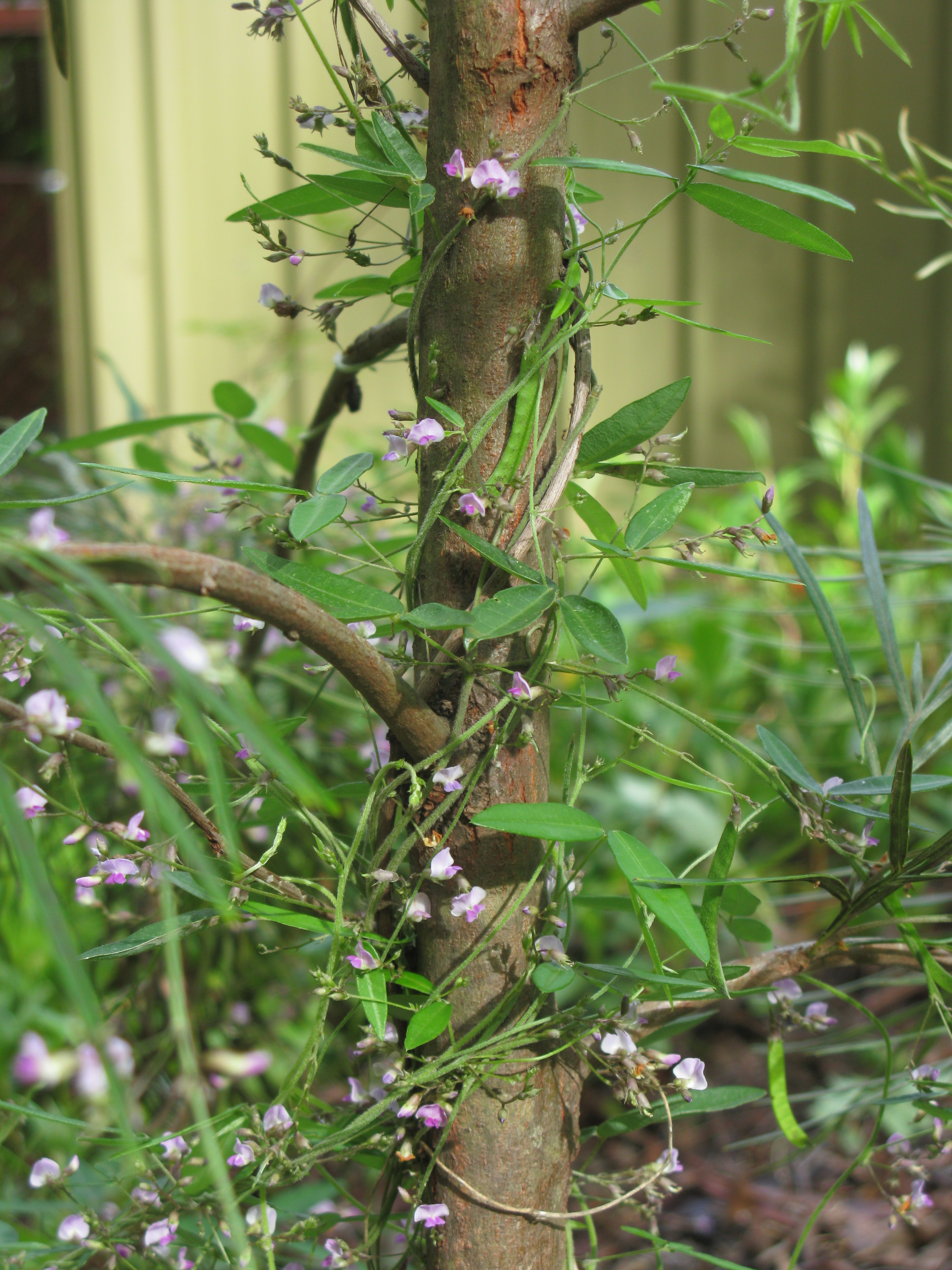
- Climbing a small tree

Scientific classification
- Kingdom: Plantae
- Clade: Tracheophytes
- Clade: Angiosperms
- Clade: Eudicots
- Clade: Rosids
- Order: Fabales
- Family: Fabaceae
- Subfamily: Faboideae
- Genus: Glycine
- Subgenus: Glycine subg. Glycine
- Species: G. cyrtoloba

Binomial name
- Glycine cyrtoloba Tindale

= Glycine cyrtoloba =

Species of plant

Glycine cyrtoloba is a species of flowering plant in the family Fabaceae, native to Queensland and New South Wales in Australia. It is a crop wild relative of soybean (Glycine max), and shows high resistance to salinity.
