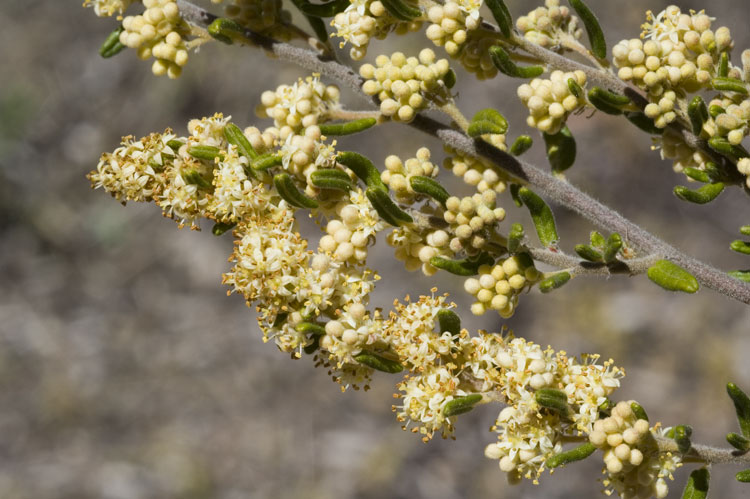
- Subspecies phylicifolia in the ANBG

Scientific classification
- Kingdom: Plantae
- Clade: Tracheophytes
- Clade: Angiosperms
- Clade: Eudicots
- Clade: Rosids
- Order: Rosales
- Family: Rhamnaceae
- Genus: Pomaderris
- Species: P. phylicifolia

Binomial name
- Pomaderris phylicifolia Lodd. ex Link

= Pomaderris phylicifolia =

Species of plant

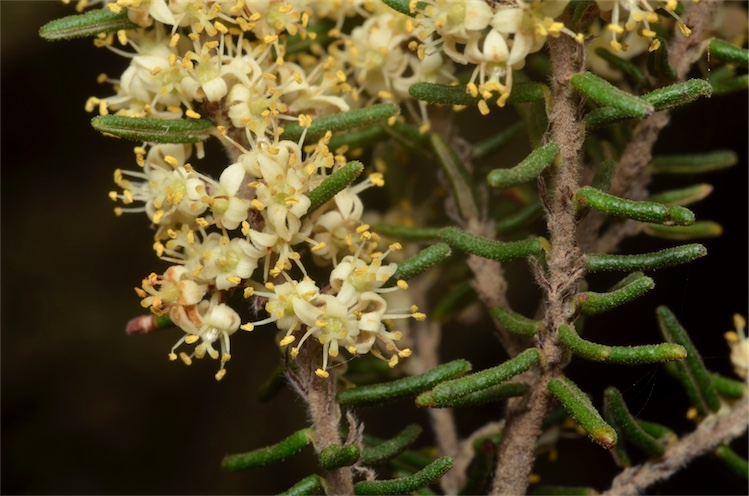
Subsp. ericoides in the Brindabellas

Pomaderris phylicifolia, commonly known as narrow-leaf pomaderris, is a species of flowering plant in the family Rhamnaceae and is to south-eastern Australia and New Zealand. It is a slender shrub with hairy stems, narrowly egg-shaped to linear leaves, and small clusters of cream-coloured to yellow flowers.

== Description ==
Pomaderris phylicifolia is a slender shrub that typically grows to a height of 1–2.5 m (3 ft 3 in – 8 ft 2 in), its branchlets covered with shaggy simple and star-shaped hairs. The leaves are egg-shaped or narrowly oblong to linear, usually 5–20 mm (0.20–0.79 in) long and 1–3 mm (0.039–0.118 in) wide with the edges turned down or rolled under. The upper surface of the leaves has a few bristly hairs, the lower surface with woolly, simple and star-shaped hairs. The flowers are cream-coloured to yellow, borne in small clusters in leaf axils near the ends of branchlets, each flower on a pedicel 0.5–2.5 mm (0.020–0.098 in) long. The petal-like sepals are 1.2–2.0 mm (0.047–0.079 in) long but soon fall off, and there are no petals. The fruit is a hairy capsule.

== Taxonomy ==
Pomaderris phylicifolia was first formally described in 1821 by Johann Heinrich Friedrich Link in his book Enumeratio Plantarum Horti Regii Berolinensis Altera from an unpublished description by the Loddiges family.

In 1997, Neville Grant Walsh and Fiona Coates described two subspecies of P. phylicifolia and the names are accepted by the Australian Plant Census:

- Pomaderris phylicifolia subsp. ericoides (Maiden & Betche) N.G.Walsh & Coates (previously Pomaderris phylicifolia var. ericoides Maiden & Betche) has linear leaves 3–8 mm (0.12–0.31 in) long and 0.7–1.3 mm (0.028–0.051 in) wide with the edges rolled under, obscuring the lower surface, and flowers from November to January;
- Pomaderris phylicifolia Lodd. ex Link subsp. phylicifolia has narrowly egg-shaped leaves, sometimes with the narrower end towards the base, 6–15 mm (0.24–0.59 in) long and 1–6 mm (0.039–0.236 in) wide, and flowers in November.

== Distribution and habitat ==
Both subspecies of narrow-leaf pomaderris are found in eastern New South Wales, eastern Victoria, and in Tasmania. Subspecies phylicifolia is also found in New Zealand. Subspecies ericoides occurs in south-eastern New South Wales and tends to occur at higher altitudes in woodland and shrubland, often near watercourses or swamps.
