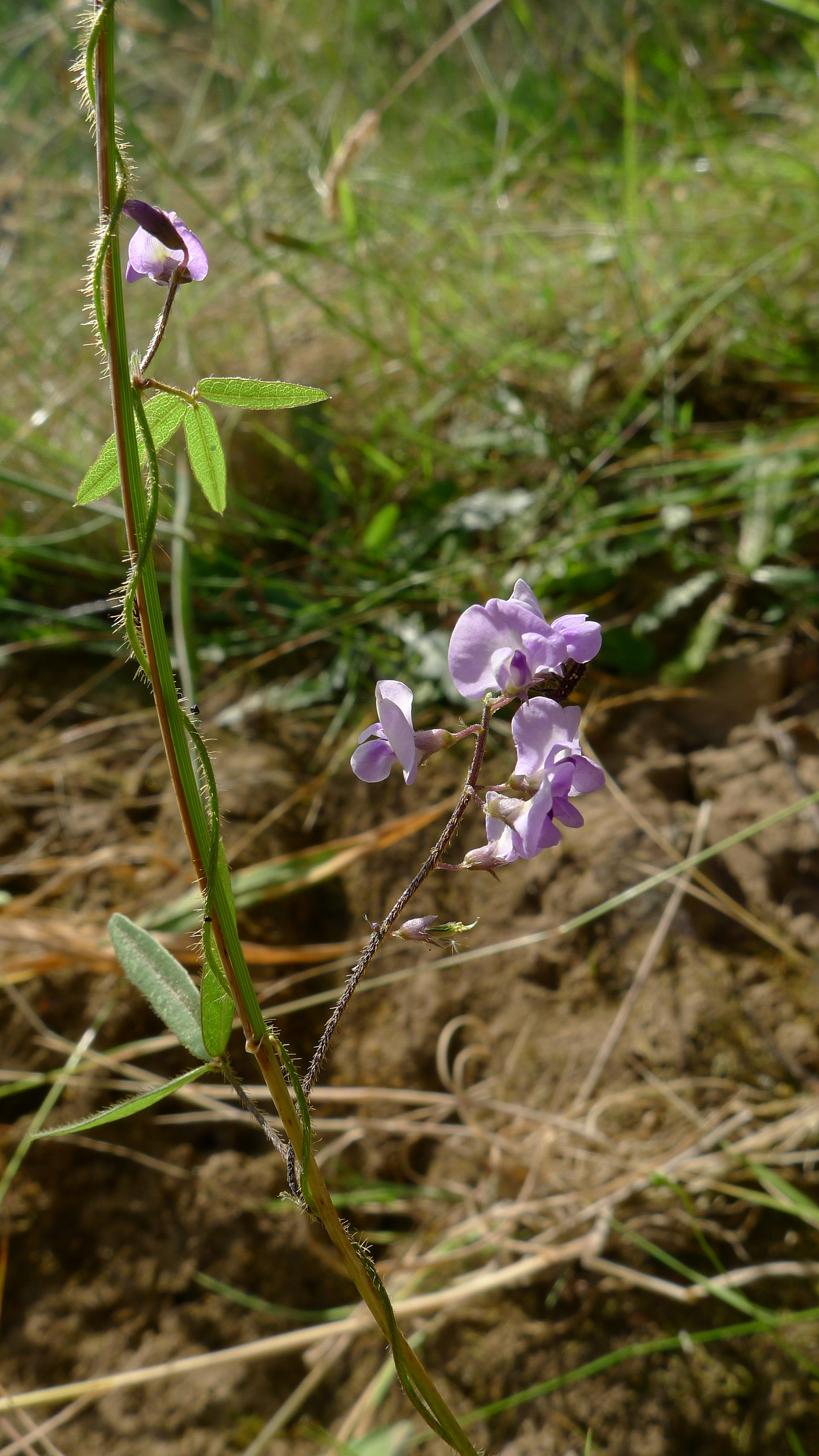

Scientific classification
- Kingdom: Plantae
- Clade: Tracheophytes
- Clade: Angiosperms
- Clade: Eudicots
- Clade: Rosids
- Order: Fabales
- Family: Fabaceae
- Subfamily: Faboideae
- Genus: Glycine
- Subgenus: Glycine subg. Glycine
- Species: G. microphylla

Binomial name
- Glycine microphylla (Benth.) Tindale

= Glycine microphylla =

Species of plant

Glycine microphylla, commonly known as the small-leaf glycine is a small scrambling plant in the bean family, found in south eastern Australia, also in the north east (tropical Queensland). Leaves are in threes, 1.5 to cm long, 1 to 6 mm wide. Flowers are variable in colour, often mauve. A widespread plant, often seen on soils derived from shale and metamorphic rocks. The specific epithet microphylla refers to the small leaves.
