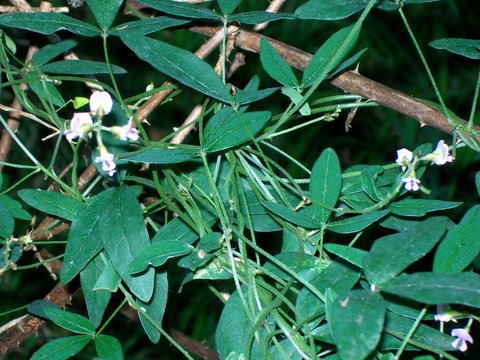
- At Eastwood, Australia

Scientific classification
- Kingdom: Plantae
- Clade: Tracheophytes
- Clade: Angiosperms
- Clade: Eudicots
- Clade: Rosids
- Order: Fabales
- Family: Fabaceae
- Subfamily: Faboideae
- Genus: Glycine
- Subgenus: Glycine subg. Glycine
- Species: G. tabacina

Binomial name
- Glycine tabacina (Labill.) Benth.

Synonyms
- Kennedia tabacina Labill.; Desmodium novo-hollandicum F.Muell.

= Glycine tabacina =

Species of legume

Glycine tabacina, commonly known as variable glycine, is a scrambling plant in the bean family found in Australia. It grows in areas of high rainfall, ranging to semi-arid areas. The leaves are in threes, 7 cm long by 2 cm wide. Bluish to purple flowers form on racemes in the warmer months. The bean pod is up to 3 cm long. The habitat is among grasses, often in open country.

== Morphology ==
There are twenty-six perennial species found of Glycine. The length of the leaflet stalks identifies it, since it has a lengthy stalk. The pea-shaped flower varies in colour from purple to mauve which blossoms throughout Spring to Autumn seasons. Once mature, their pods become black in colour, with the seeds [usually 4 – 8] inside are red to brown. The stems are typically slender and can reach to 1m in length, either trailing or creeping and often twining. The stems are often covered in stiff, straight hairs, emerging from a thickened root system. The leaves are usually tri-foliolate pinnate, and the rachis may vary in length between 5 and 45 mm, with pubescence comparable to the stem.

The leaflets appear generally narrow with straight, stiff hairs [strigose] beneath the leaves, although they can also be sparsely strigose or glabrous [without straight stiff hairs] above. The apical portion of this species is generally broader or longer than that of the lateral portion of this species. Lower leaves are typically broad, oval to elliptic shape (10-15 x 8–14 mm), obtuse to truncate, acute, tapering at the base, and often noticeably net-veined underneath. Upper leaflets are normally elliptic-lanceolate to slightly linear (7-50 x 3–7 mm), sharp to blunt and apiculate, abruptly sharp to curved at the base, and on the petiolules, they are covered in coarse, long hairs. Many of the leaves are commonly elliptical to widely oblong (20-40 x 10–20 mm). The stipels have an acicular shape (1-1.5 mm in length). The stipules range in shape, from deltoid to oblong-lanceolate (1.5–3 mm in length).

Flowers can reach 6 to 8 mm in length and can grow on strigose pedicels, which can reach 0.5 to 2 mm long. On the distal portion of this species, racemoids [flowers grow on a singular angle and are intermediate inflorescence] on the stalk of the flower can measure from 2 to 12 cm in length and generally consists of 4 to 12 flowers. Bracts, are reduced leaf sizes located on the base of flower bases grow 1 to 2 mm long and are slender. The sepals within the flower [calyx] grow 3 to 4 mm long and can vary from strigose or glabrous.

Insects pollinate this plant, and is a hermaphrodite, consisting of male and female cells. It is known that this plant has the ability to undergo nitrogen fixation. Biological nitrogen fixation is mostly accomplished via a symbiotic relationship between legumes (Glycine tabacina) and specific nitrogen-fixing microbes which turn elemental nitrogen to ammonia. This plant maintains a mutual relationship to specific soil microorganisms, in which the specific soil microorganisms create nodules upon roots and repair atmospheric nitrogen.

== Distribution and habitat ==
Glycine tabacina is native in Australia. However, can also be located in China, Pacific Islands, Papua New Guinea, Indonesia, Philippines and Taiwan. In Australia, Glycine tabacina are mostly located in New South Wales, Queensland, Victoria and Western Australia. Within Eastern Australia, Glycine tabacina are frequently and largely scattered and found in cosmopolitan areas. Typically, Glycine tabacina grow within grasses in wide forest lands and woodland areas. It can also be found in dense forests and rainforest riverbeds, though it is uncommon near ocean shores. Glycine tabacina thrives in moist soils, loamy clay soils, and does not require shade. The pH level that is best for Glycine tabacina growth can vary from acidic to alkaline. After a fire, this plant has the ability to re-sprout from the root and regenerates extensively from seed. There have been no toxic elements that have been discovered yet. This is a nectar plant for butterflies as well as a food plant for certain caterpillar groups.

== Use ==
=== Aboriginal use ===
Indigenous communities consumed the liquorice - flavoured root. First Nations peoples in New south wales and Queensland are said to have roasted, crushed, chewed, and they would expectorate the fiber. Fibrous but starchy, with no discernible taste [6]. It is not known if Aboriginal communities currently consume the roots of Glycine tabacina. It is not known if Aboriginal communities use this plant for medicinal purposes.

=== Medicinal use ===
Glycine tabacina, a legume plant, is a well-known natural medicine and Chinese herbal medicine. The roots were used in traditional medicine to treat osteoporosis, nephritis, rheumatism, and menopausal syndrome. Glycine tabacina is often used as an herbal tea in Taiwan and is one of the origins of the folk medicine, I – TiaoGung. Nevertheless, some phytochemical and pharmacological research on this plant have been reported. The extract was shown to have anti-inflammatory, anti-arthritic [6], antioxidant, and antidiabetic properties in vitro.

A study conducted by Yanbei Tu in 2019, in which they examined the anti-arthritic impact of ethanol extract from Glycine tabacina on a collagen-induced arthritis mouse model. The mouse model orally received Glycine tabacina extract powder [1.11g, 2.22g, 4.44g] daily beginning from day zero and extended for 30 days. The extent of arthritis was determined by measuring the width of paws, arthritis index levels, X – rays, histopathological changes and swelling size. Physical examination on mouse models, swelling on paws and arthritis index revealed that orally administering Glycine tabacina extract substantially reduced arthritic symptoms in collagen – induced arthritis mouse models. Through X – ray and histopathological analyses, it was highlighted that Glycine tabacina extract actively shielded the cartilage and bone joints against deterioration, lesion, and distortion.

In this study, to evaluate the anti-arthritic effect of ethanol extracted from G.tabacina (GTE), collagen-induced rats were used as a pathologic model. In the present day, it has been observed that numerous herds and natural extracts have the potential to have anti-arthritic having negligible toxicities as well as side effects. This species of plant has previously been used to treat diseases such as rheumatism and nephritis. However, little is known about the chemical constituents as well as the pharmacological activities of G.tabacina (GTE). At present, cytokines: TNF-α, IL-6, IL-1β and IL-1 are blocked using biological products having therapeutic capabilities such as Infliximab (anti-TNF-α Ab), Anakinra (IL-1R antagonist) and Tocilizumab (anti-IL-6R Ab).

In this study, the severity of rheumatoid arthritis was determined by observing the serum levels of the cytokines: IL-1β, IL-6 and TNF-α on different days (14,21,28) which resulted in significantly decreased cytokine serum levels and validated the anti-arthritis activity of G.tabacina (GTE). In rheumatoid arthritis, oxidative stress is considered to play an important part in chronic inflammation which causes neutrophils residing in the joint compartment to produce increased amounts of reactive oxygen species (ROS) causing cartilage and bone damage.

Further, the increased amounts of ROS in rheumatoid arthritis sufferers also caused lipid peroxidation and DNA deterioration as well as cause the retardation of defensive mechanisms (i.e., SOD and catalase). The cytokine: TNF-α plays a major role in regulating rheumatoid arthritis activity and worsens the inflammation via the production of ROS when oxidative stress is heightened. This study observed that under arthritic conditions the T-SOD activity in the experimental subject's serum was decreased, however, this increased significantly with G.tabacina (GTE) treatment. The GTE treatment also observed a significant decrease in the MDA levels.

The results of this study suggest that G.tabacina (GTE) has the possibility of retaining anti-arthritic properties through the alleviation of oxidative stress in the subjects. Even though, the chemical properties of G.tabacina (GTE) is still not fully known, this study observed through HPLC analysis that this species of plant had an abundance of numerous conventional isoflavonoids (i.e., genistin, daidzein, genistein, pratensein, etc.) which indicate that the anti-arthritic activities of GTE might have stemmed from these isoflavonoids. The isoflavonoid, genistin has been shown to stop differentiation of osteoclasts and promote their proliferation. This cytokine has further been observed to lessen the arthritis induced by collagen II in mice and rats.

Another study conducted by Lihua Tan, published in 2020, investigated the medicinal mechanisms and actions of aqueous extract in Glycine tabacina when treating nephrotic syndrome in mice models. The study specifically examined mice for movement hysteresis, weight loss, water content, and food intake after being injected with ADR (Adriamycin (ADR)). Glycine tabacina extract administration (GATE) significantly reduced protein levels in urine and hyperlipoproteinemia symptoms, in nephrotic syndrome mouse, as demonstrated by lower urinary protein and albumin excretion, and reduced plasma total cholesterol and triglyceride levels. Furthermore, GATE also improved the intake of food, movement, and reduced weight loss. This study is the first to show that conditions such as heavy proteinuria, deteriorating renal function and, hyperlipidaemia could be substantially improved after Glycine tabacina extract administration (GATE) which has opened potential pathways for the prevention and treatment of other kidney diseases and Nephrotic Syndromes (NS). Reduced blood urea nitrogen and creatinine levels in nephrotic syndrome mouse indicated that Glycine tabacina aqueous extract may prevent the kidneys from consequences of adverse drug reaction. Adverse drug reaction - induced pathological defects in renal tissues were prevented by Glycine tabacina aqueous extract therapy.

In this study, the levels of creatinine, plasma Bun, triglyceride, and total cholesterol after ADR injection were observed to be significantly increased in the experimental mice group, whereas these levels were opposed and decreased by GATE. Histological studies on these experimental mice discovered that notable damages were caused to renal tissues (i.e., glomerular deformation, tubular damages, etc.) in the ADR treated mice. On the other hand, these damages to the renal tissues caused by ADR were decreased by GATE suggesting its protective effect in ADR-induced renal injury. In this study, network pharmacology was used to better comprehend the connections between Nephrotic Syndromes treatment and the administration of GATE. The results observed from network pharmacology discovered that multiple pathways and targets were involved in the modification of GATE on Nephrotic Syndromes (NS). The expected pathways and targets of GATE involved in Nephrotic Syndromes were tightly related with inflammation and oxidative stress.

In this study conducted by Lihua Tan, it was further observed that the ADR injected mice had relatively higher intracellular ROS (Reactive oxygen species) production in their renal tissue, while the GATE treatment substantially reversed this alteration caused by ADR. In contrast to the ADR injected mice, the GATE treated mice had reduced MDA (Malonaldehyde) levels. In the ADR injected mice, the SOD (Superoxide dismutase) activity was reduced in renal tissues and plasma and was identified to be under Nephrotic Syndromes condition, which was observed to be repaired by the GATE treatment. The results from this study, which were consistent with network pharmacology, suggested that the GATE treatment could defend mice from renal injury by mitigating ADR-induced oxidative stress and inflammation in Nephrotic Syndromes (NS) mice.
