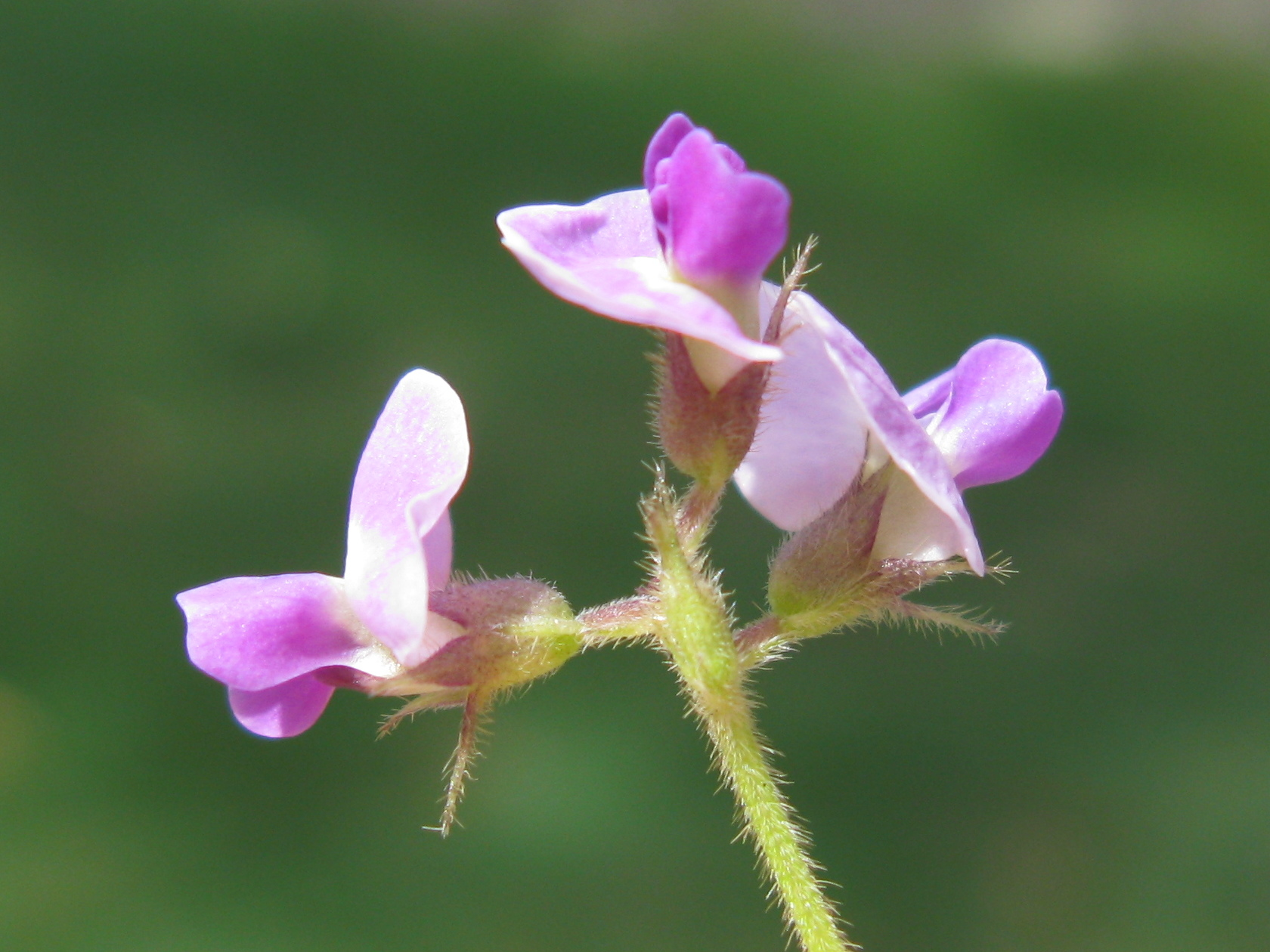
- Glycine tomentella inflorescence

Scientific classification
- Kingdom: Plantae
- Clade: Tracheophytes
- Clade: Angiosperms
- Clade: Eudicots
- Clade: Rosids
- Order: Fabales
- Family: Fabaceae
- Subfamily: Faboideae
- Genus: Glycine
- Subgenus: Glycine subg. Glycine
- Species: G. tomentella

Binomial name
- Glycine tomentella Hayata

Synonyms
- Glycine tomentosa (Benth.) Benth.; Leptolobium tomentosum Benth.

= Glycine tomentella =

Species of plant in the genus Glycine

Glycine tomentella, called the woolly glycine or rusty glycine, is a species of soybean found in Australia, New Guinea, New Caledonia, the Philippines, Taiwan and southeast coastal China. In Australia, it is found in New South Wales, Queensland, the Northern Territory and Western Australia. Glycine tomentella is a complex of polyploid forms, with 2n=38, 2n=40, 2n=78 and 2n=80 chromosome counts detected in different populations. All four forms are found in Australia, the 40‑chromosome and 78‑chromosome forms are also found in New Guinea, and the 80‑chromosome form is found across the entire range.
