= Physopella =

Scientific classification
- Kingdom: Fungi
- Division: Basidiomycota
- Class: Pucciniomycetes
- Order: Pucciniales
- Family: Phakopsoraceae
- Genus: Physopella; Arthur, 1906

Species
- See text.

Genus of fungi

Physopella is a genus of fungal plant pathogen in the family Phakopsoraceae. As of September 2026, it contains 24 accepted species.

Edwin Mains described the genus Angiopsora in 1934, but it was reduced to synonymy in 1958, as Joseph Charles Arthur had already described the genus as Physopella in 1906. In 1992, Angiopsora was moved to synonymy with Phakopsora.

== Species ==
- Physopella agrostidis Pardo-Card. & Gjaerum
- Physopella americana Buriticá & J.F. Hennen
- Physopella artocarpi (Berk. & Broome)
- Physopella bagchii Buriticá & J.F. Hennen
- Physopella castellanii Y. Ono, Buriticá & J.F. Hennen
- Physopella caucensis (Mayor) Buriticá
- Physopella concors (Arthur) Arthur
- Physopella desmodii-pulchelli (Syd. & P. Syd.) Y. Ono, Buriticá & J.F. Hennen
- Physopella ficina (Juel) Arthur accepted
- Physopella guettardae Buriticá & J.F. Hennen
- Physopella hashiokae Buriticá & J.F. Hennen
- Physopella hiratsukae (Syd.) Cummins & Ramachar
- Physopella inflexa (S. Ito) Buriticá & J.F. Hennen
- Physopella melinidis Cummins
- Physopella mexicana Cummins
- Physopella oplismeni B.V. Patil & Thirum.
- Physopella schreberae Bagyan., P. Ramesh & Y. Ono
- Physopella securinegae Buriticá & J.F. Hennen
- Physopella sinensis Syd. & P. Syd.
- Physopella sporoboli Pardo-Card.
- Physopella stakmanii Sathe accepted
- Physopella vernoniae (T.S. Ramakr.) Ramachar & Bhagyan.
- Physopella wiehei (Cummins) Cummins & Ramachar
- Physopella xanthostemonis (J. Walker) J.A. Simpson, K. Thomas & Grgur.
