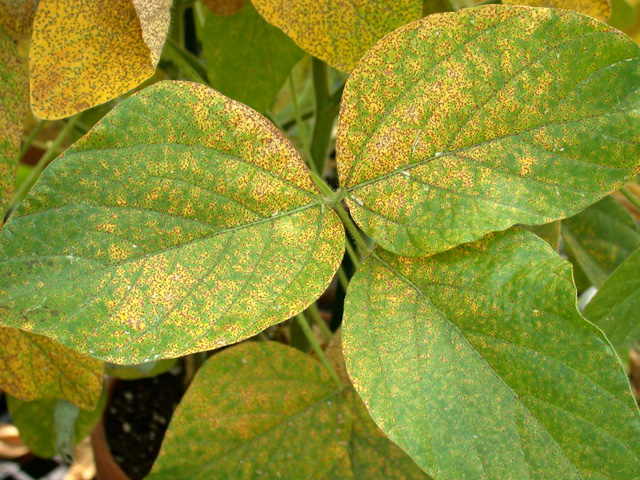
- Soybean leaves infected with soybean rust

Scientific classification
- Kingdom: Fungi
- Division: Basidiomycota
- Class: Pucciniomycetes
- Order: Pucciniales
- Family: Phakopsoraceae (Arthur) Cummins & Hirats. f.

Type genus
- Phakopsora Dietel

Genera
- see text

= Phakopsoraceae =

Family of fungi

The Phakopsoraceae are a family of rust fungi in the order Pucciniales. The family contains 18 genera and 205 species.

== Genera ==
- Aeciure
- Arthuria
- Batistopsora
- Bubakia
- Catenulopsora
- Cerotelium
- Crossopsora
- Dasturella
- Kweilingia
- Macabuna
- Monosporidium
- Newinia
- Nothoravenelia
- Phakopsora
- Phragmidiella
- Physopella
- Pucciniostele
- Scalarispora
- Stakmania Kamat & Sathe, 1968
- Tunicopsora
- Uredendo
- Uredopeltis
- Uredostilbe
