= Frederick Joseph Hermann =

Frederick Joseph Hermann (born 1906 - died 1987) was an American botanist. Hermann worked at the University of Michigan Botanical Garden from 1933 to 1938, and later worked for the United States Department of Agriculture's Bureau of Plant Industry.
