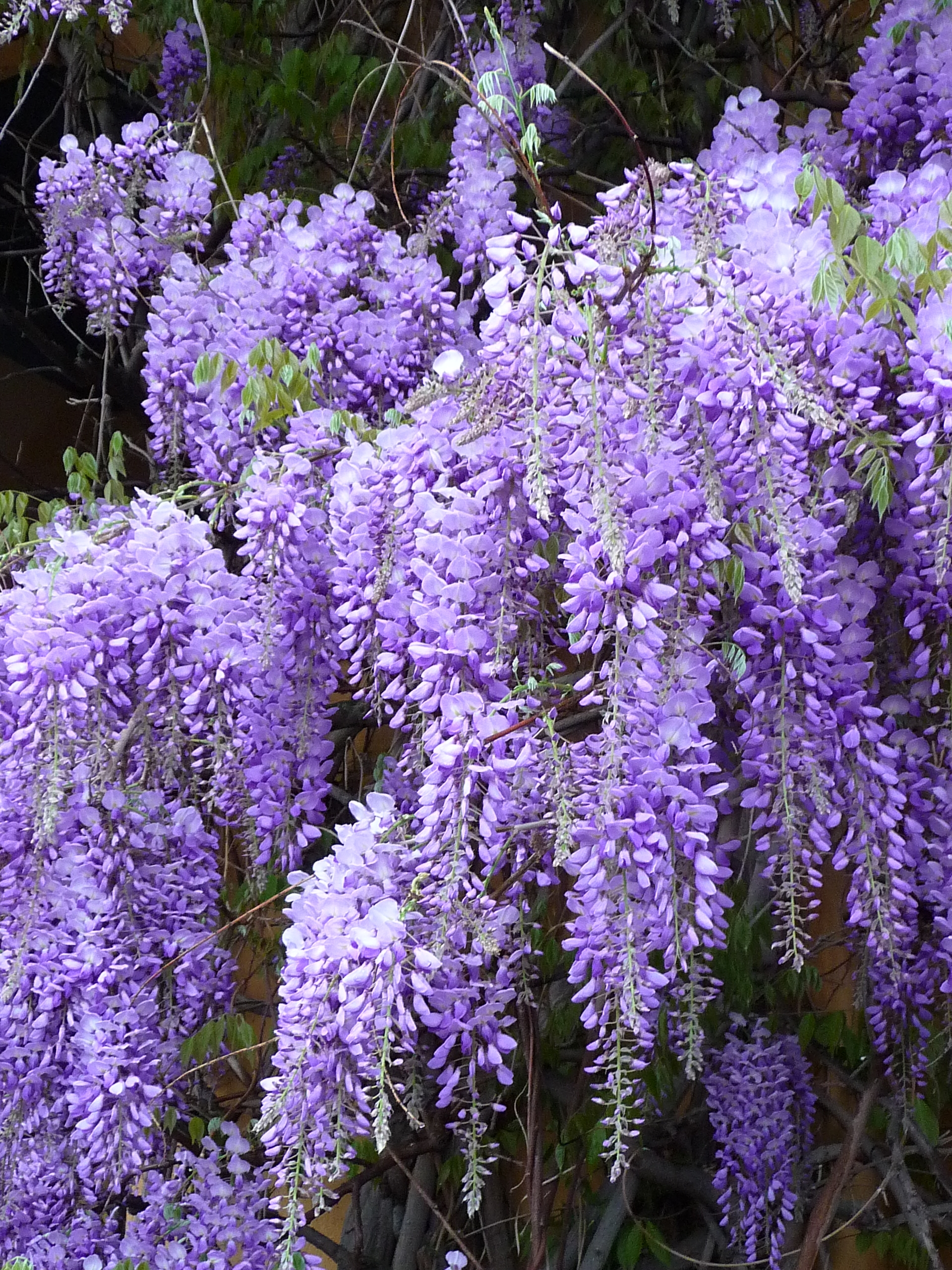
- Flowering Wisteria sinensis

Scientific classification
- Kingdom: Plantae
- Clade: Tracheophytes
- Clade: Angiosperms
- Clade: Eudicots
- Clade: Rosids
- Order: Fabales
- Family: Fabaceae
- Subfamily: Faboideae
- Tribe: Wisterieae
- Genus: Wisteria; Nutt. (1818), nom. cons.

Synonyms
- Bradburia Spreng. (1826); Diplonyx Raf. (1817), nom. rej.; Kraunhia Raf. (1891), nom. superfl.; Phaseoloides Duhamel (1755), nom. rej.; Rehsonia Stritch (1984); Thyrsanthus Elliott (1818), nom. illeg.; Wistaria Nutt. ex Spreng. (1826), orth. var.

= Wisteria =

Genus of vines with lavender or white flowers

Wisteria is a genus of flowering plants in the legume family, Fabaceae (Leguminosae). The genus includes four species of woody twining vines that are native to China, Japan, and the Eastern United States (see Asa Gray disjunction). Some species are popular ornamental plants. They were introduced to Europe, the Indian subcontinent, and other countries around the world. The genus name is also used as the English name, and may then be spelt 'wistaria'.

== Description ==
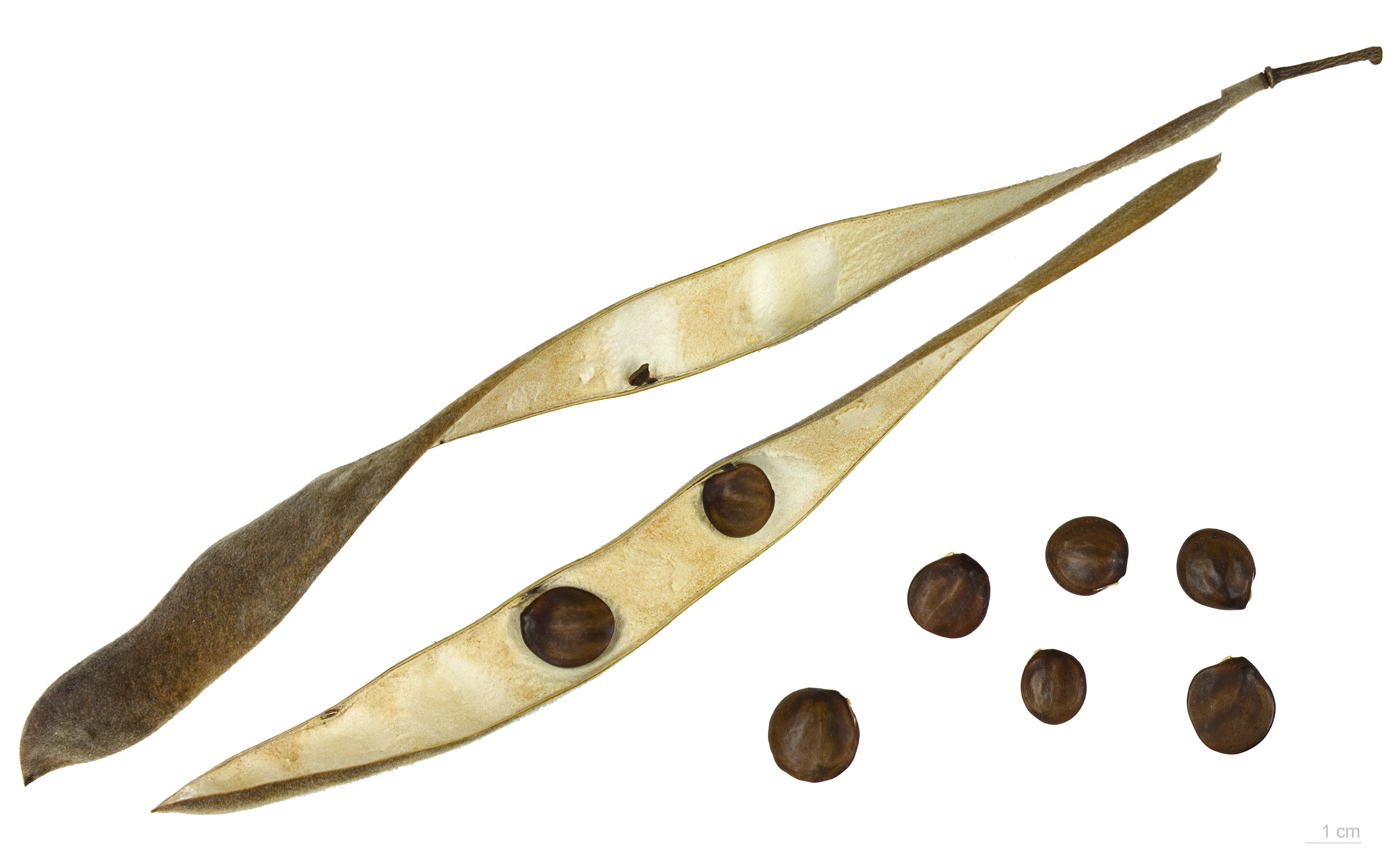
Seeds and seedpods of Wisteria floribunda (Japanese wisteria). The seeds of all Wisteria species contain high levels of the wisterin toxin and are especially poisonous.

Wisterias climb by twining their stems around any available support. W. floribunda (Japanese wisteria) twines clockwise when viewed from above, while W. sinensis (Chinese wisteria) twines counterclockwise. This is an aid in identifying the two most common species of wisteria. They can climb as high as 20 m (66 ft) above the ground and spread out 10 m (33 ft) laterally. The world's largest known wisteria is the Sierra Madre Wisteria in Sierra Madre, California, measuring more than 1 acre (0.40 ha) in size and weighing 250 tons. Planted in 1894, it is of the 'Chinese lavender' variety.

The leaves are alternate, 15 to 35 cm long, pinnate, with 9 to 19 leaflets.

The flowers have drooping racemes that vary in length from species to species. W. frutescens (American wisteria) has the shortest racemes, 5–7 centimetres (2.0–2.8 in). W. floribunda (Japanese wisteria) has the longest racemes, 90 centimetres (35 in) in some varieties and 120 centimetres (47 in) or 200 centimetres (79 in) in some cultivars. The flowers come in a variety of colors, including white, lilac, purple, and pink, and some W. brachybotrys (Silky wisteria) and W. floribunda cultivars have particularly remarkable colors. The flowers are fragrant, and especially cultivars of W. brachybotrys, W. floribunda, and W. sinensis are noted for their sweet and musky scents. Flowering is in spring (just before or as the leaves open) in some Asian species, and in mid to late summer in the American species.

The seeds are produced in pods similar to those of Laburnum.

== Taxonomy ==
The genus Wisteria was established by Thomas Nuttall in 1818. He based the genus on Wisteria frutescens, previously included in the genus Glycine. Nuttall stated that he named the genus in memory of the American physician and anatomist Caspar Wistar (1761–1818). Both men were living in Philadelphia at the time, where Wistar was a professor in the School of Medicine at the University of Pennsylvania. Questioned about the spelling later, Nuttall said it was for "euphony", but his biographer speculated that it may have something to do with Nuttall's friend Charles Jones Wister Sr., of Grumblethorpe, the grandson of the merchant John Wister. Various sources assert that the naming occurred in Philadelphia. It has been suggested that the Portuguese botanist and geologist José Francisco Corrêa da Serra, who lived in Philadelphia beginning in 1812, four years before his appointment as ambassador of Portugal to the United States, and a friend of Wistar, proposed the name "Wistaria" in his obituary of Wistar.

In some countries in Western and Central Europe, Wisteria is also known by a variant spelling of the genus in which species were formerly placed, Glycine. Examples include the French glycines, the German Glyzinie, and the Polish glicynia.

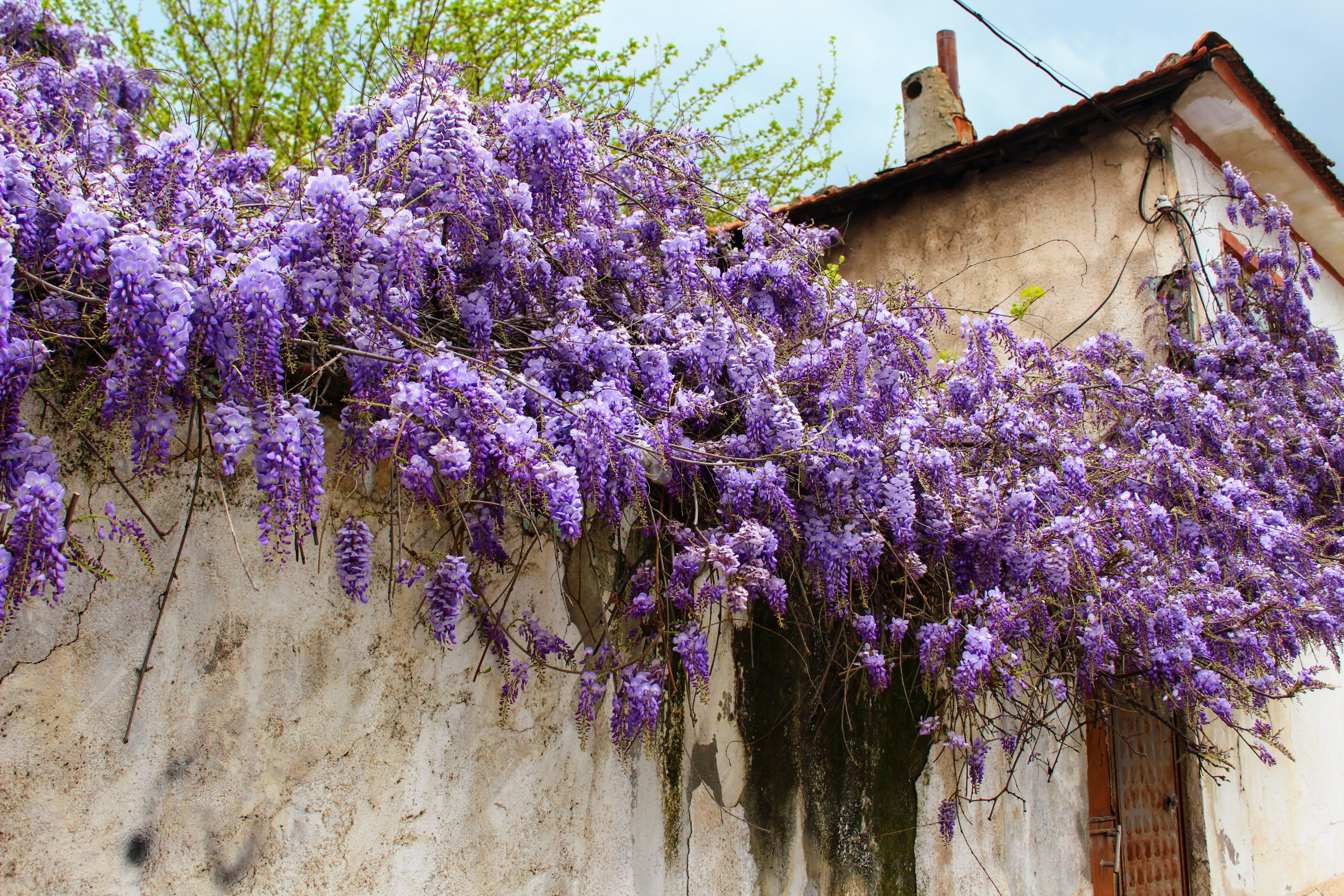
Wisteria, Turkey

As the spelling is apparently deliberate, there is no justification for changing the genus name under the International Code of Nomenclature for algae, fungi, and plants.

=== Classification ===
The genus was previously placed in the tribe Millettieae. Molecular phylogenetic studies from 2000 onwards showed that Wisteria, along with other genera such as Callerya and Afgekia, were related and quite distinct from other members of the Millettieae. A more detailed study in 2019 reached the same conclusion, and moved Wisteria to the expanded tribe Wisterieae.

=== Species ===
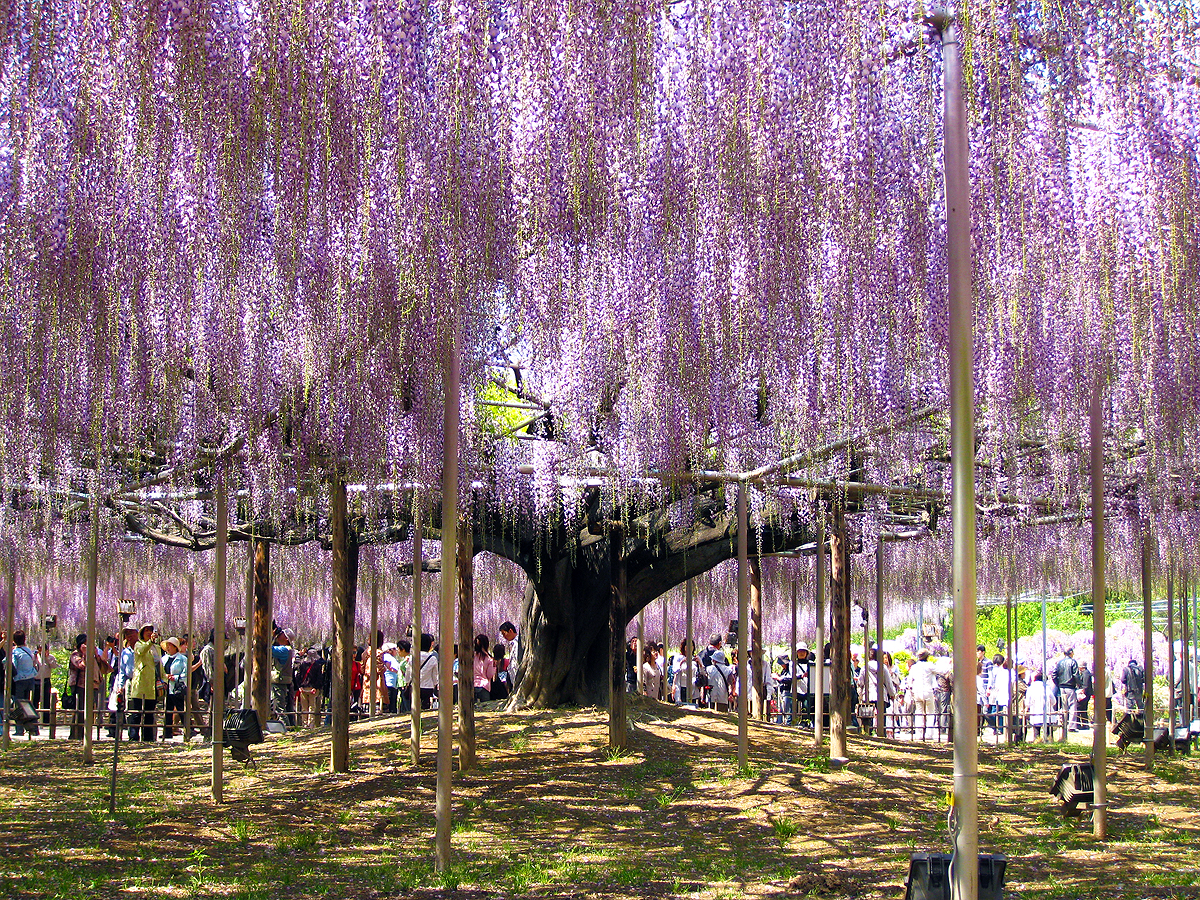
W. floribunda at Ashikaga Flower Park (ja) in Ashikaga, Tochigi, Japan. The largest wisteria in Japan, it is dated to c. 1870 and covered approximately 1,990 square metres (21,400 sq ft) as of May 2008.

As of September 2023, Plants of the World Online accepted four species:

Image	Scientific name	Common name	Distribution
	Wisteria brachybotrys Siebold & Zucc. (syn. Wisteria venusta Rehder & Wils.)	Silky wisteria	Japan
	Wisteria floribunda (Willd.) DC.	Japanese wisteria	Japan
	Wisteria frutescens (L.) Poir. (syn. Wisteria macrostachys)	American wisteria	United States (Kentucky to Texas, to Florida, as well as Iowa, Michigan, and New York)
	Wisteria sinensis (Sims) DC.	Chinese wisteria	China (Guangxi, Guizhou, Hebei, Henan, Hubei, Shaanxi, and Yunnan.)

==== Garden hybrids ====
- Wisteria × formosa
- Wisteria × valderi

==== Fossil species ====
Additionally, the following fossil species have been described:

- †Wisteria fallax (Nath.) Tanai, Onoe
- †Wisteria kamtschatica Cheleb.
- †Wisteria ligniata Miki.
- †Wisteria shanwangensis Wang, Dilcher,. Zhu, Zhou et Lott
- †Wisteria sichote-alinensis Akhmet.
- †Wisteria taoiana Wang, Dilcher,. Zhu, Zhou et Lott

== Ecology ==
Wisteria species are used as food by the larvae of some Lepidoptera species, including different kinds of moths.

== Toxicity ==
All parts of the plant contain a saponin called wisterin, which is toxic if ingested, and may cause dizziness, confusion, speech problems, nausea, vomiting, stomach pains, diarrhea, and collapse. There is debate over whether the concentration outside of the seeds is sufficient to cause poisoning. Some Japanese sources assure that parts of the W. floribunda can be eaten at certain stages if prepared properly and in moderate amounts: young shoots and leaves may be eaten after blanching or boiling before serving with rice or fried while seeds may be consumable if harvested between July to September when they are not bitter. Nevertheless, wisteria seeds outside that caveat have caused cases of poisoning in children and pets of many countries, producing mild to severe gastroenteritis and other effects.

== Cultivation ==
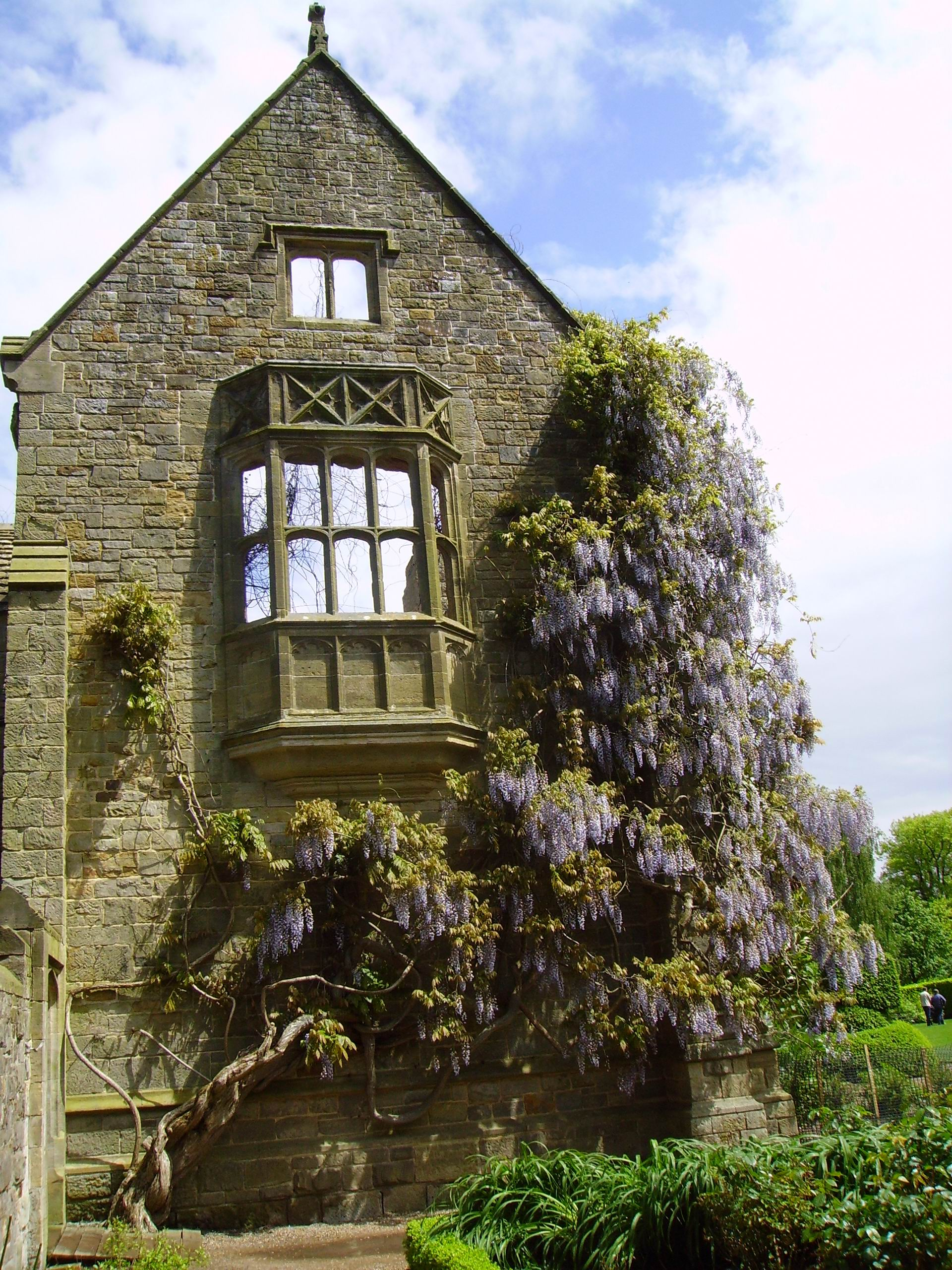
Wisteria at Nymans Gardens
(West Sussex, England)

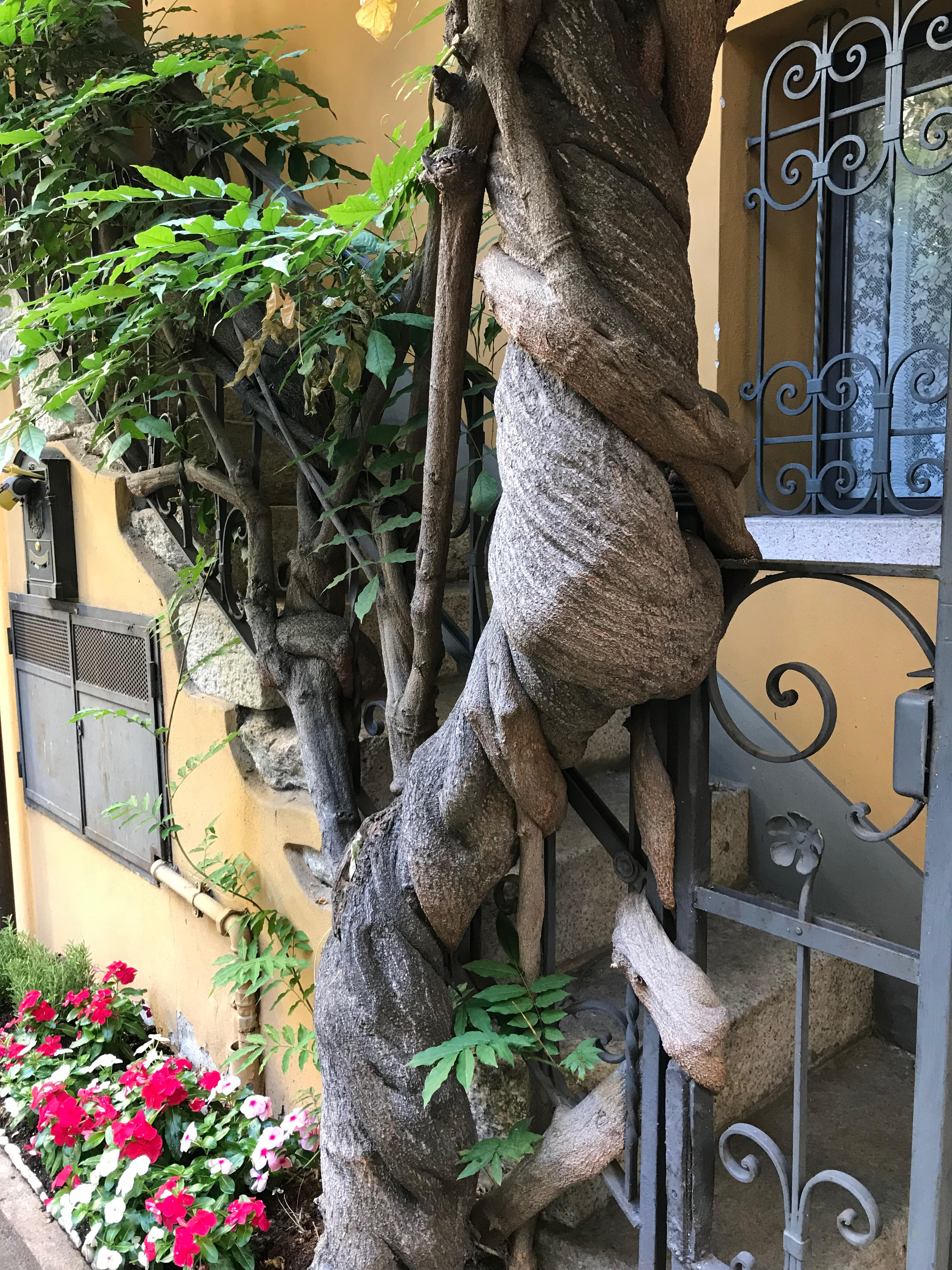
Trunk of mature wisteria supported by balustrade (Stresa, Italy)

In North America, W. floribunda (Japanese wisteria) and W. sinensis (Chinese wisteria) are far more popular than other species for their abundance of flowers, clusters of large flowers, variety of flower colors, and fragrance. W. sinensis was brought to the United States for horticultural purposes in 1816, while W. floribunda was introduced around 1830. Because of their hardiness and tendency to escape cultivation, these non-native wisterias are considered invasive species in many parts of the U.S., especially the Southeast, due to their ability to overtake and choke out other native plant species.

W. floribunda (Japanese wisteria), which has the longest racemes of wisteria species, is decorative and has given rise to many cultivars that have won the prestigious Award of Garden Merit.

Wisteria, especially W. sinensis (Chinese wisteria), is very hardy and fast-growing. It can grow in fairly poor-quality soils, but prefers fertile, moist, well-drained soil. It thrives in full sun and can be propagated via hardwood cutting, softwood cuttings, or seed. However, specimens grown from seed can take decades to bloom; for this reason, gardeners usually grow plants that have been started from rooted cuttings or grafted cultivars known to flower well.

Another reason for failure to bloom can be excessive fertilizer (particularly nitrogen). Wisteria has nitrogen fixing capability (provided by Rhizobia bacteria in root nodules), and thus mature plants may benefit from added potassium and phosphate, but not nitrogen. Finally, wisteria can be reluctant to bloom before it has reached maturity. Maturation may require only a few years, as in W. macrostachya (Kentucky wisteria), or nearly twenty, as in W. sinensis. Maturation can be forced by physically abusing the main trunk, root pruning, or drought stress.

Wisteria can grow into a mound when unsupported, but is at its best when allowed to clamber up a tree, pergola, wall, or other supporting structure. W. floribunda (Japanese wisteria) with longer racemes is the best choice to grow along a pergola. W. sinensis (Chinese wisteria) with shorter racemes is the best choice for growing along a wall. Whatever the case, the support must be very sturdy, because mature wisteria can become immensely strong with heavy wrist-thick trunks and stems. These can collapse latticework, crush thin wooden posts, and even strangle large trees. Wisteria allowed to grow on houses can cause damage to gutters, downspouts, and similar structures. Wisteria flowers develop in buds near the base of the previous year's growth, so pruning back side shoots to the basal few buds in early spring can enhance the visibility of the flowers. If it is desired to control the size of the plant, the side shoots can be shortened to between 20 and 40 cm long in midsummer, and back to 10 to 20 centimetres (3.9 to 7.9 in) in the fall. Once the plant is a few years old, a relatively compact, free-flowering form can be achieved by pruning off the new tendrils three times during the growing season in the summer months. The flowers of some varieties are edible, and can even be used to make wine. Others are said to be toxic. Careful identification by an expert is strongly recommended before consuming this or any wild plant.

In the United Kingdom, a national collection of wisteria is held by Chris Lane at the Witch Hazel Nursery in Newington, near Sittingbourne in Kent and at the National Collection for Plant Heritage at Wisley in Surrey.

== Art and symbolism ==
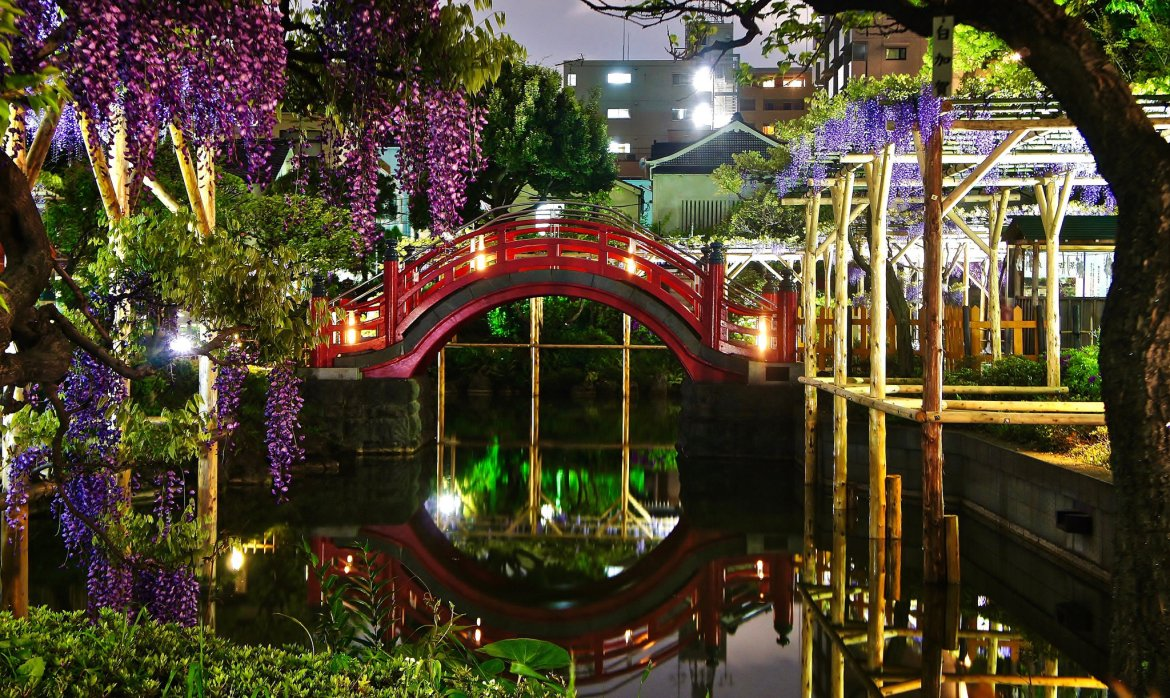
Kameido Tenjin Shrine Wisteria Festival (April 2016)

Wisteria and their racemes have been widely used in Japan throughout the centuries and were a popular symbol in mon (family crests) and heraldry. Wisteria is one of the five most commonly used motifs in the mon, and there are more than 150 types of wisteria mon. Because of its longevity and fertility, wisteria was considered an auspicious plant and was favored as a mon, and was adopted and popularized by the Fujiwara clan as their mon. Fujiwara (藤原) literally means "wisteria field". Many other Japanese surnames contain the kanji for wisteria, such as Satō (佐藤), Itoh (伊藤), Saitō (斉藤) and Fujii (藤井).

A popular dance in kabuki known as the Fuji Musume (or 'The Wisteria Maiden'), is the sole extant dance of a series of five personifying dances in which a maiden becomes the embodiment of the spirit of wisteria. In the West, both in building materials such as tile, as well as stained glass, wisterias have been used both in realism and stylistically in artistic works and industrial design.

Sagari fuji mon (Wisteria mon)

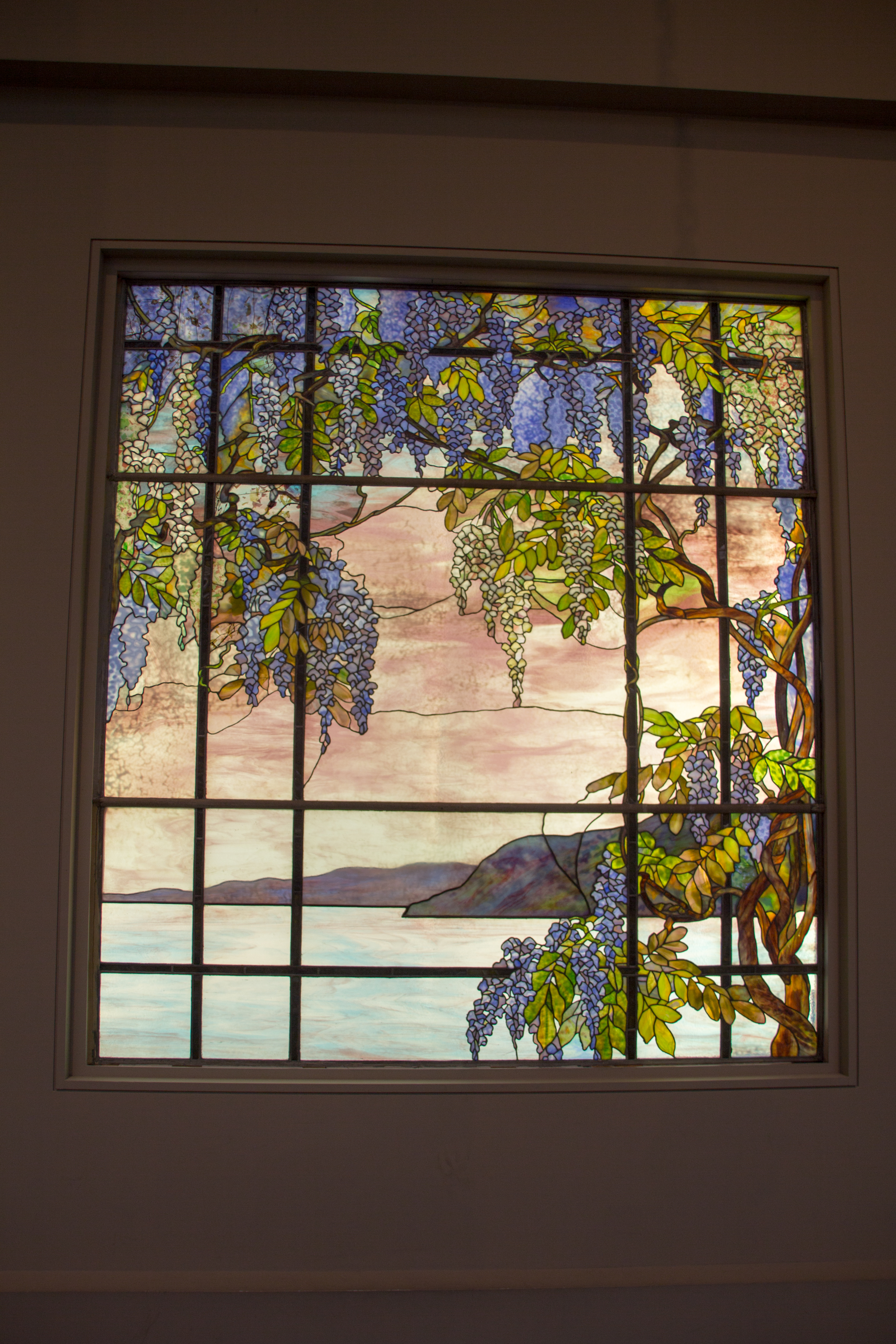
View of Oyster Bay (1908), by Louis C. Tiffany, with wisteria evoking the estate of its patrons, Wistariahurst

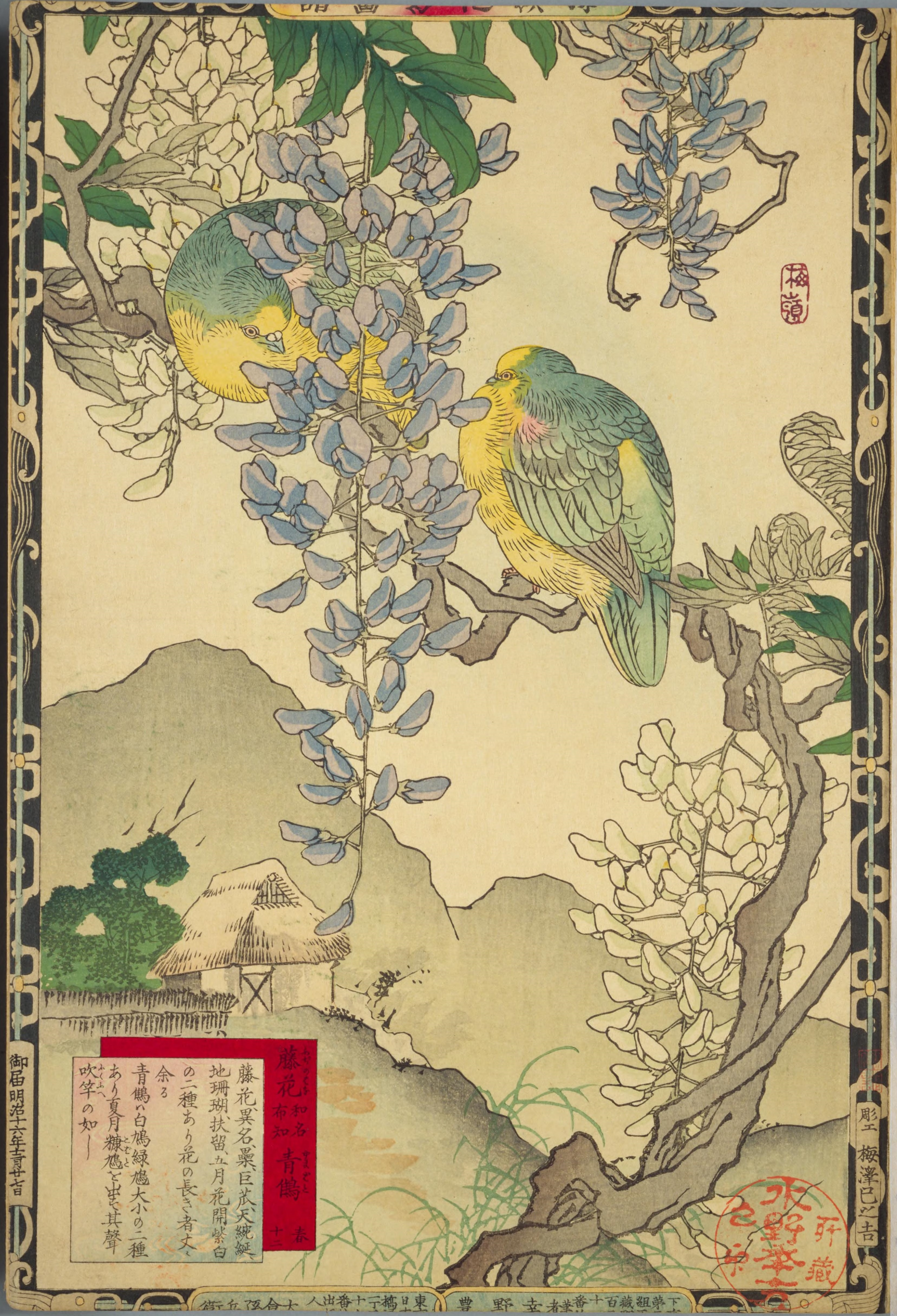
Japanese wisteria and white-bellied green pigeons (1883), a woodblock print by Kōno Bairei

Wisteria in Hanafuda

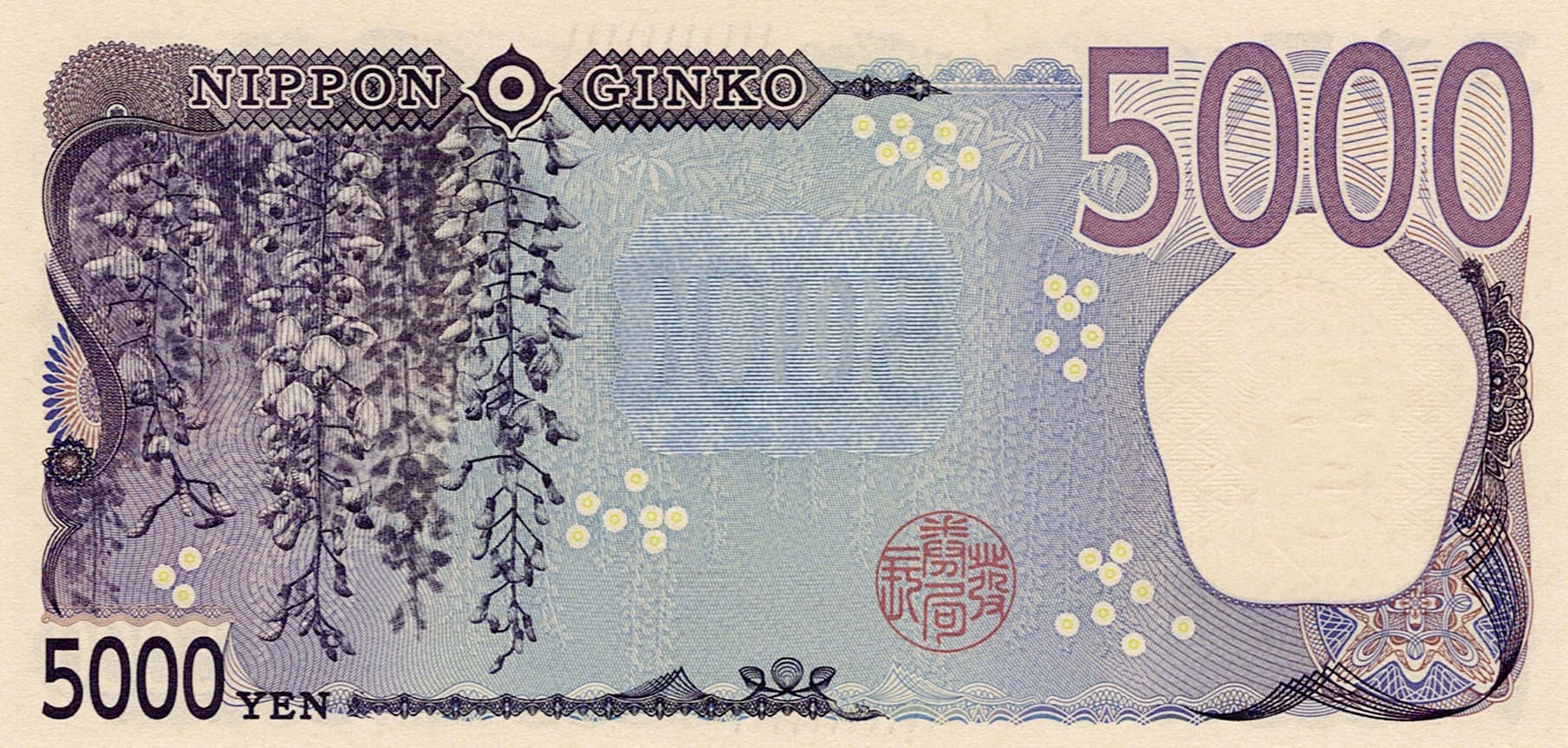
5000 yen note
