= Caspar Wistar (physician) =

American physician (1761-1818)

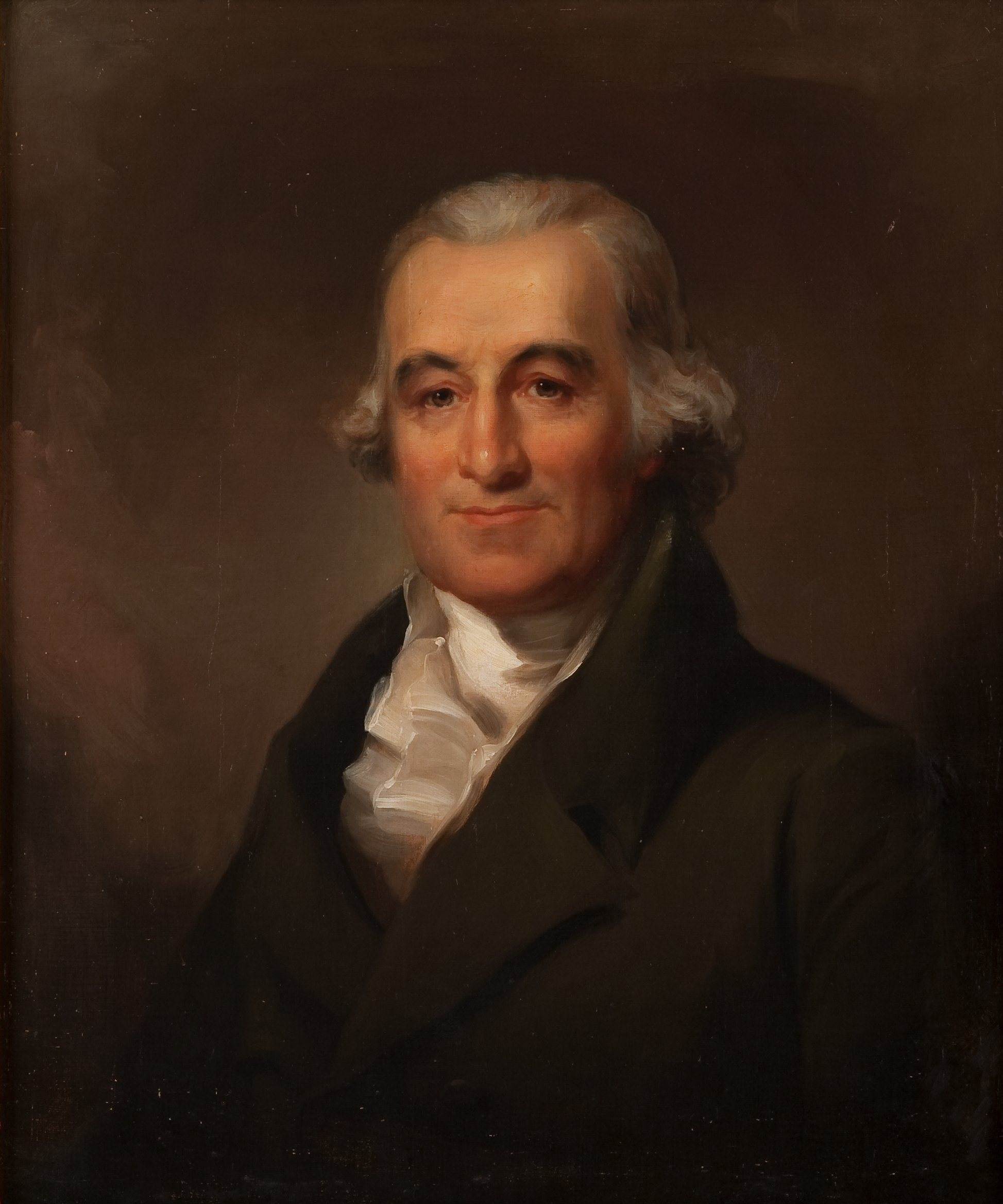
- Wistar by Thomas Sully (1830), copy after Bass Otis (1817)
- Born: September 13, 1761; Philadelphia
- Died: January 22, 1818 (aged 56)
- Other name: Caspar Wistar the Younger
- Education: University of Pennsylvania, University of Edinburgh
- Known for: Development of a set of anatomical models
- Relatives: Caspar Wistar (glassmaker): grandfather, Sally Wister (cousin), Samuel Morris (uncle)
- Scientific career
- Fields: Human anatomy
- Workplaces: University of Pennsylvania
- Academic advisors: John Redman

Caspar Wistar (/ˌkæspər ˈwɪstɑːr/; KASS-pər-WISS-tar) (September 13, 1761 – January 22, 1818) was an American physician and anatomist. He is sometimes referred to as Caspar Wistar the Younger, to distinguish him from his grandfather of the same name. The plant genus Wisteria is named for him.

== Biography ==
Wistar was born in Philadelphia, Pennsylvania, the son of Richard Wistar (1727–1781) and Sarah Wyatt (1733–1771). He was the grandson of Caspar Wistar (1696–1752), a German immigrant, Quaker and glassmaker.

=== Education ===
He was educated at the Friends' school in his native city, where he received a thorough classical training. His interest in medicine began while he was aiding in the care of the wounded after the battle of Germantown, and he made his first studies under the direction of Dr. John Redman. He studied medicine, first at the University of Pennsylvania (receiving his Bachelor of Medicine degree in 1782), and then at the University of Edinburgh (receiving his Doctor of Medicine degree in 1786). While in Scotland he was, for two successive years, president of the Royal Medical Society of Edinburgh, and also president of a society for the further investigation of natural history.

=== Career ===
Upon his return to the U.S. in January 1787, he entered on the practice of his profession in Philadelphia, where he was at once appointed one of the physicians to the Philadelphia Dispensary.

On October 5, 1787, Wistar and Timothy Matlack presented a probable dinosaur metatarsal discovered in Late Cretaceous rocks near Woodbury Creek as "a large thigh bone" to the American Philosophical Society in Philadelphia, Pennsylvania.

He was professor of chemistry and the institutes of medicine in the College of Philadelphia from 1789 till 1792, when the faculty of that institution united with the medical department of the University of Pennsylvania, of which he was adjunct professor of anatomy, midwifery, and surgery until 1808. In that year, on the death of his associate, Dr. William Shippen Jr., he was given the chair of anatomy, which he retained until his death. He was elected a Fellow of the American Academy of Arts and Sciences in 1803.

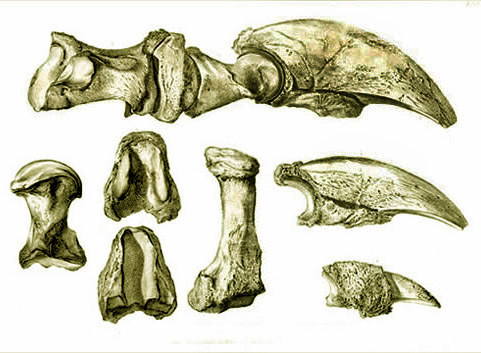
Bones of the prehistoric giant ground sloth Megalonyx, described in a 1799 paper for the Transactions of the American Philosophical Society by Wistar. These were the first fossils illustrated from the United States.

For his teaching at the University of Pennsylvania, he developed a set of anatomical models—human remains preserved by injecting them with wax—to assist with the teaching of anatomy. He published A System of Anatomy in two volumes from 1811 to 1814. His fame attracted students to his lectures, and he was largely the means of establishing the reputation of the school. Meanwhile, he was chosen physician to the Pennsylvania Hospital, where he remained until 1810. His reputation as an anatomist was increased by his description of the posterior portion of the ethmoid bone with the triangular bones attached, which received universal recognition as an original treatment of the subject.

He was an early promoter of vaccination. During the yellow fever epidemic of 1793, he suffered an attack of the disease contracted while caring for his patients.

It was his habit to throw open his house once every week in the winter, and at these gatherings students, citizens, scientists, and travelers met and discussed subjects of interest. These assemblies, celebrated in the annals of Philadelphia under the title of Wistar parties, were continued long after his death by other residents of that city.

The American College of Physicians elected him a fellow in 1787, and he was appointed one of its censors in 1794, which place he retained until his death. In 1787 he was elected to membership of the American Philosophical Society, served as curator until he was chosen its vice-president in 1795, and on the resignation of Thomas Jefferson, in 1815, served as president until his death. He also served as president of the Society for the Abolition of Slavery, succeeding Benjamin Rush.

The botanist Thomas Nuttall named the genus Wisteria in his honour (some call it Wistaria but the misspelling is conserved under the International Code of Botanical Nomenclature). The Wistar Institute of Anatomy and Biology at the University of Pennsylvania, founded in 1892 by his great-nephew, Isaac Jones Wistar, is also named for Caspar Wistar.

Wistar was a friend of Thomas Jefferson, with whom he worked to identify bones of the megalonyx and through whom he tutored Meriwether Lewis, including recommendations for scientific inquiry on the Lewis and Clark expedition.

== Family ==
In 1788 he married Isabella Marshall, who died in 1790. He married Elizabeth Mifflin in 1798.

His brother Richard (20 July 1756 – 6 June 1821) was a Philadelphia merchant who built a large four-story store in 1790 where he conducted an iron and hardware business. With the profits, he purchased lands and houses in the vicinity of Philadelphia. During the Revolutionary War, Richard advocated the defense of his property by arms, which resulted in his being disowned by the Society of Friends. Richard was an inspector of prisons, and was one of the early friends and supporters of the Library Company of Philadelphia and the Pennsylvania Hospital.

Caspar was a cousin of Revolutionary diarist Sally Wister and nephew of Samuel Morris.

== Death ==
Wistar died on January 22, 1818, of a "severe attack of typhus fever".

== See also ==
- Organ Cave
- List of eponyms
- Sierra Madre Wisteria

== Sources ==
- The Wistar-Wister Family
- Wilson, J. G.; Fiske, J., eds. (1889). "Wistar, Richard" . Appletons' Cyclopædia of American Biography. New York: D. Appleton.
