= Wisteria × formosa =

Scientific classification
- Kingdom: Plantae
- Clade: Tracheophytes
- Clade: Angiosperms
- Clade: Eudicots
- Clade: Rosids
- Order: Fabales
- Family: Fabaceae
- Subfamily: Faboideae
- Genus: Wisteria
- Species: W. × formosa

Binomial name
- Wisteria × formosa Rehder

Synonyms
- Rehsonia × formosa (Rehder) Stritch

Species of plant

Wisteria × formosa, the beautiful wisteria, is an artificial hybrid species of flowering plant in the family Fabaceae. Its parents are Wisteria floribunda (from Japan) and Wisteria sinensis (from China). A deciduous liana reaching 9 m (30 ft), it has a number of cultivars, with 'Caroline' being widely available from commercial nurseries.
