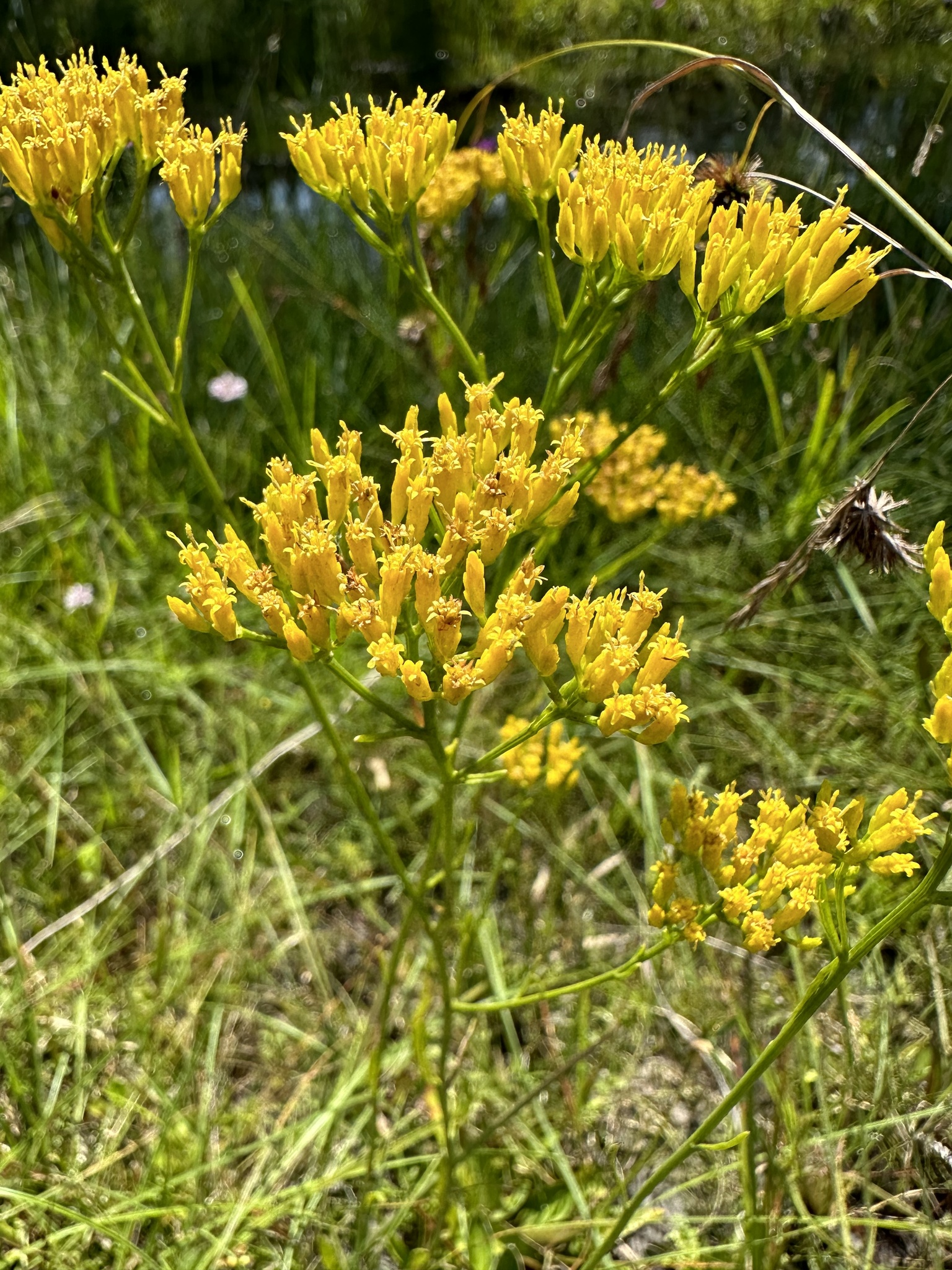

Conservation status
- Secure (NatureServe)

Scientific classification
- Kingdom: Plantae
- Clade: Tracheophytes
- Clade: Angiosperms
- Clade: Eudicots
- Clade: Asterids
- Order: Asterales
- Family: Asteraceae
- Genus: Bigelowia
- Species: B. nudata

Binomial name
- Bigelowia nudata (Michx.) DC.

Synonyms
- Aster nutatus Kuntze; Bigelowia virgata (Nutt.) DC.; Chondrophora nudata (Michx.) Britton; Chondrophora virgata (Nutt.) Greene; Chrysocoma nudata Michx.; Chrysocoma virgata Nutt.

= Bigelowia nudata =

Pineland rayless goldenrod

Species of flowering plant

Bigelowia nudata, the pineland rayless goldenrod, is a species of North American flowering plant in the family Asteraceae. It is native to the coastal plain of the southeastern United States (from eastern Louisiana to North Carolina).

Varieties

- Bigelowia nudata var. australis (L.C.Anderson) Shinners - Florida Panhandle
- Bigelowia nudata var. nudata - from eastern Louisiana to North Carolina
- Bigelowia nudata var. spathulifolia Torr. & A.Gray

== Description ==
Bigelowia nudata is a sub-shrub that grows up to 70 cm (28 in) tall, often forming clumps. Most of the leaves are in a rosette near the ground, with smaller and narrower leaves on the stems. They are alternately arranged, and are most commonly oblanceolate in shape. Flower heads are small, yellow, and displayed in flat-topped arrays, each with 2-6 disc florets but no ray florets. The plants generally grow in swamps and bogs.

== Distribution and habitat ==
B. nudata can be found throughout the southeast United States. Its native range stretches from Texas to North Carolina, but occurs most frequently between southern Mississippi and North Carolina.

This species occurs primarily in mesic to wet habitat types. It can be found in systems with moist sandy loam (such as pine barrens and savannas), as well as areas with rich sandy soils (such as those found in open pinelands and wet prairies).

B. nudata, often occurring in ecosystems with a fire regime, has displayed a positive reaction to fire, having been observed to experience an increase in inflorescence after multiple burns have been conducted.
