= Sierra Madre Wistaria =

Giant flowering vine in California. Largest single flowering plant

Sierra Madre Wisteria
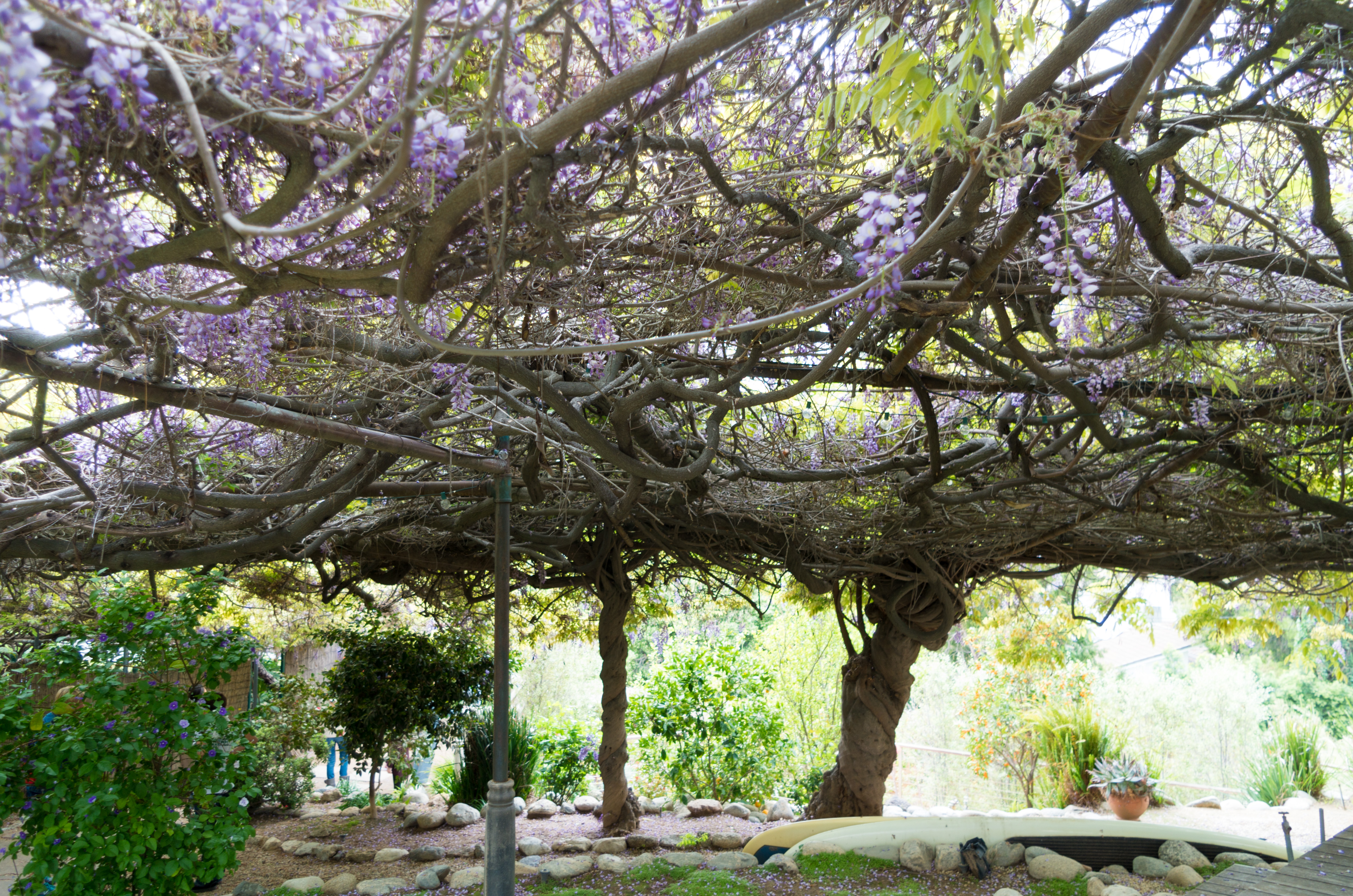
- Sierra Madre Wistaria is the largest single flowering plant in the world.

- Location within California
- Species: Wistaria ('Wisteria sinensis)
- Coordinates: 34.161717°N 118.05695°W
- Date seeded: 1894

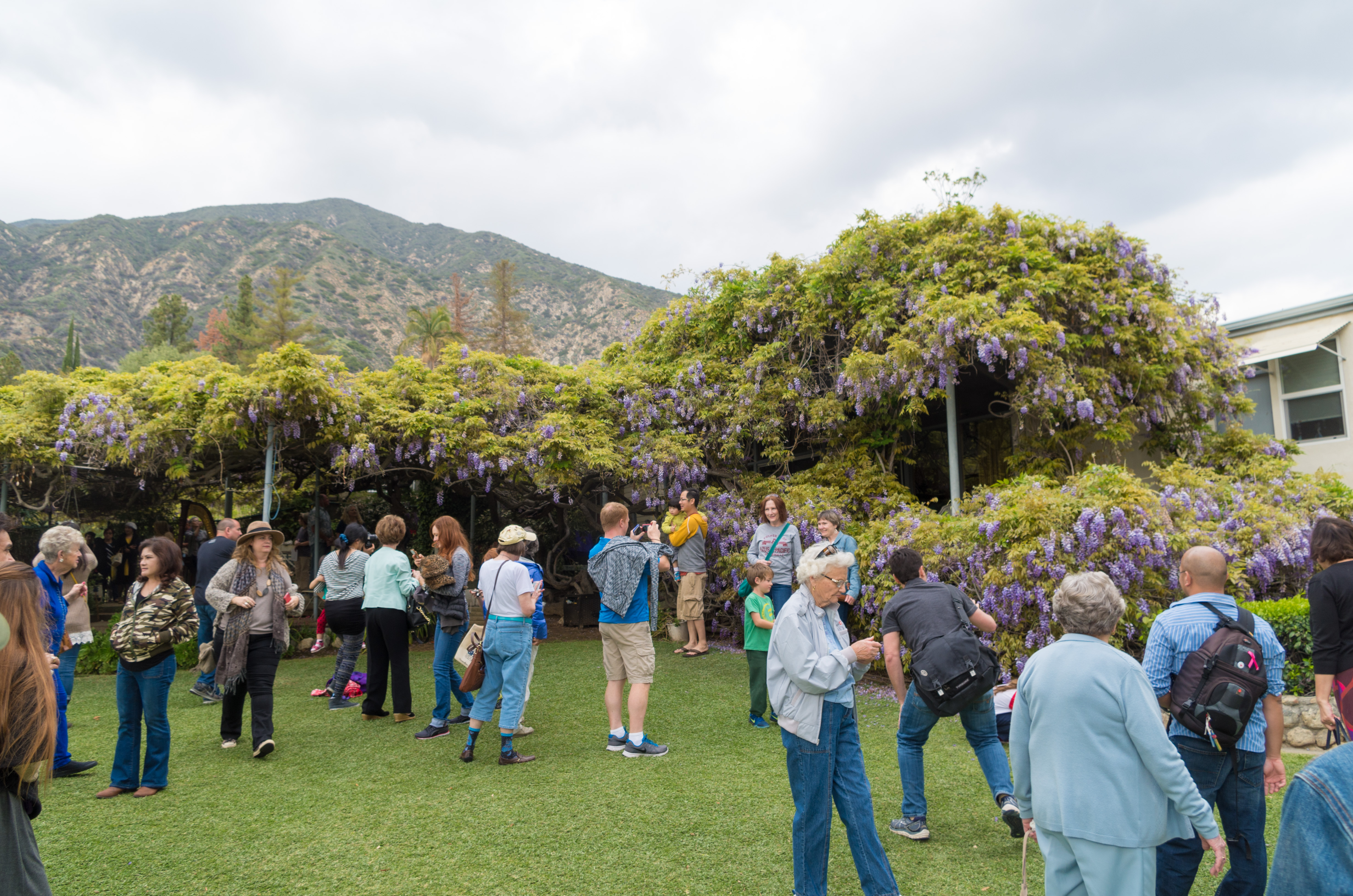
Sierra Madre Wistaria Festival in 2016

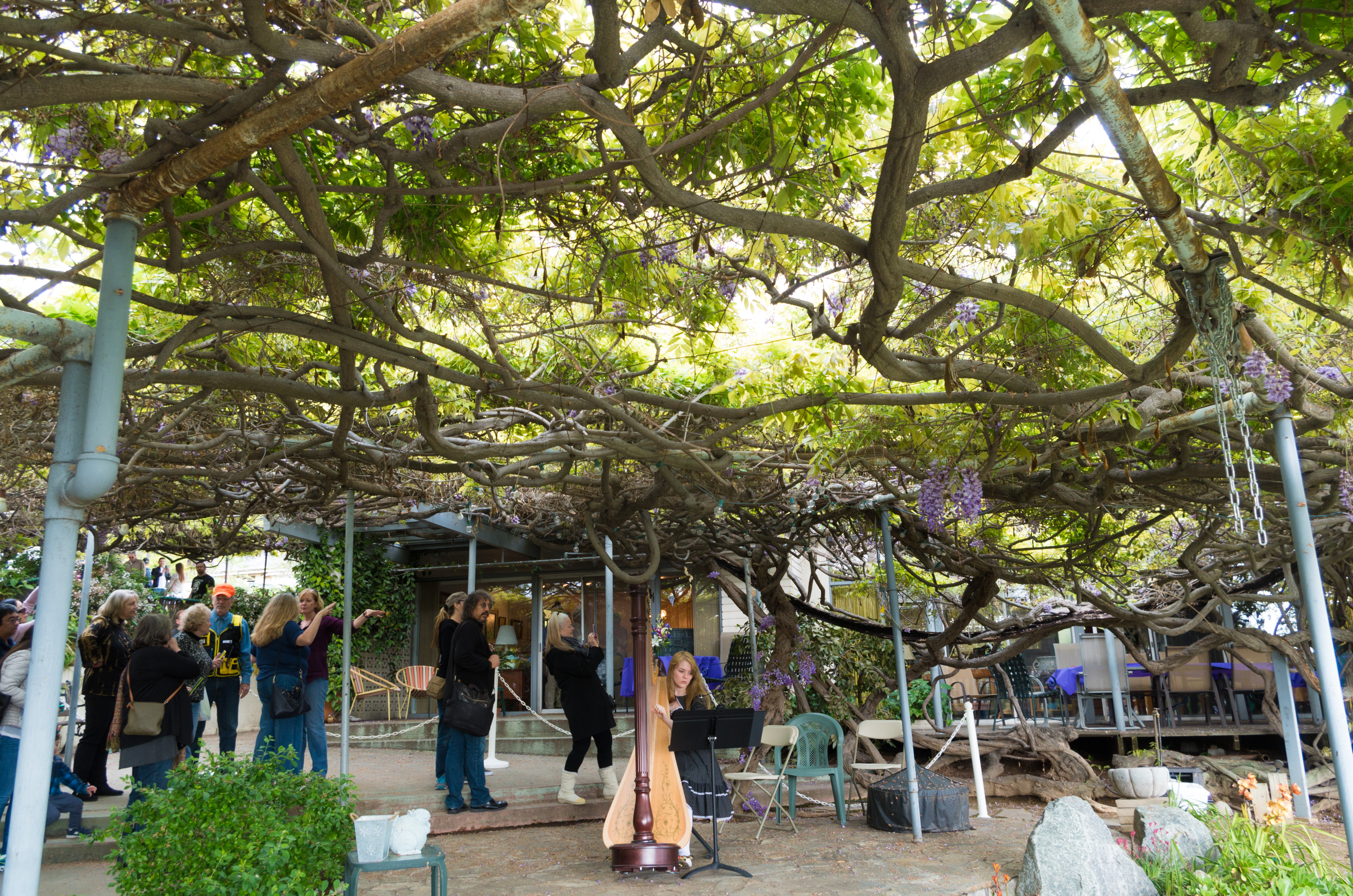
Under the Sierra Madre Wistaria at the Wistaria Festival in 2016

Sierra Madre Wisteria or The Wistaria Vine is a flowering Wisteria vine shown at the annual Wistaria Festival in Sierra Madre, California. The Wistaria Vine in 1990 was declared by the Guinness Book of World Records to be the largest blossoming plant in the world. The Wistaria vine is named after physician Caspar Wistar (1761–1818) by botanist Thomas Nuttall (1786–1859). The general name for the plant is spelled Wisteria. This single wisteria vine covers over an acre. The Wistaria Vine has over 1.5 million blossoms and weighs over 250 tons. The plant is on private land and open to the public once a year during the Wistaria Festival.

== History ==
The vine was planted in 1894 by Mrs. William (Alice) Brugman. Brugman purchased the vine from the old Wilson nursery, in Monrovia, for seventy-five cents in a 1-gallon bucket. The vine's trunk is now over a meter in diameter. The lavender flowers have a sweet fragrance. Mrs. Brugman sold the home and the vine to Henry and Estelle Fennell in 1912. The Fennells promoted the vine's growth, building arbors and trellises to keep it off the ground. The vine is on the alluvial plain of the San Gabriel Mountains, with a good water source and drainage. The vine grew onto the house. From 1894 to 1930, the Pacific Electric's Sierra Madre Line street cars bought visitors from around greater Los Angeles to Wistaria Festival. The weight of the vine later collapsed the roof. A new house was built north of the vine. In 1936, the Fennells sold the house and vine to Carrie Ida Lawless. Lawless built new arbors and trellises to keep the vine off the ground and the house. Lawless died in 1942, and her nephew Bruce McGill inherited the house and vine. McGill worked with the Sierra Madre Garden Club in care of the vine. The original lot was subdivided in 1961, so the vine is now on two adjoining properties. Due to the vine's status, the vine is now maintained by experts from universities and local horticulturists. The Sierra Madre Wisteria is one of the Seven Horticultural Wonders of the World.

== Wistaria Festival ==
Sierra Madre is known for its annual Wistaria Festival normally held in March. Wistaria Festival showcases the Chinese wisteria (Wisteria sinensis). The Wistaria Vine currently spans two backyards in Sierra Madre. In addition to the annual tour of The Wistaria Vine, the city hosts an artisan's arts and craft festival. Wistaria Festival also has live music at Sierra Madre Memorial Park, with food trucks. The vine is in bloom for March to mid-April. The Wistaria is on the City of Sierra Madre's Flag designed in 2005 with the San Gabriel Mountains, the 1896 Old North Church and the 1974 Bell Tower in Kersting Court.

== See also ==
- Lignum nephriticum
