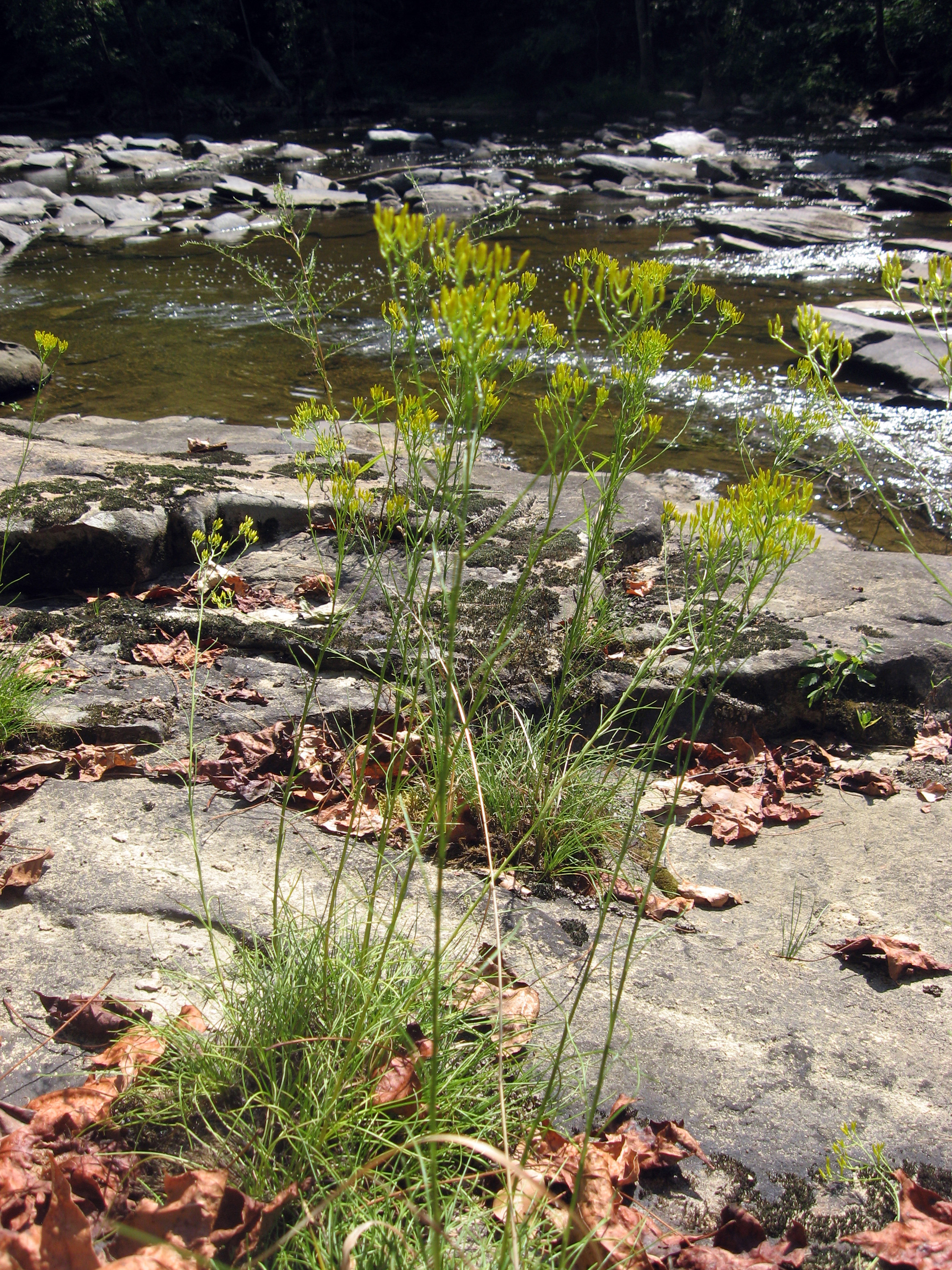
- Bigelowia nuttallii Black Warrior River, Blount County, Alabama

Scientific classification
- Kingdom: Plantae
- Clade: Tracheophytes
- Clade: Angiosperms
- Clade: Eudicots
- Clade: Asterids
- Order: Asterales
- Family: Asteraceae
- Subfamily: Asteroideae
- Tribe: Astereae
- Subtribe: Gutiereziinae
- Genus: Bigelowia; DC. 1836, not Raf. 1817

Synonyms
- Bigelovia spelling variation; Aciclinium Torr. & A.Gray; Chondrophora Raf. ex Porter & Britton; Chondrophora Raf.

= Bigelowia =

Genus of flowering plants

Bigelowia is a genus of North American flowering plants in the family Asteraceae, native to the United States.

Bigelowia plants are subshrubs, often forming clumps. They have very small but numerous displays of small yellow flower heads with disc florets but no ray florets.

Species

- Bigelowia nudata (Michx.) DC. – Louisiana Alabama Mississippi Georgia Florida South Carolina North Carolina
- Bigelowia nuttallii L.C.Anderson – Texas Louisiana Alabama Georgia Florida
