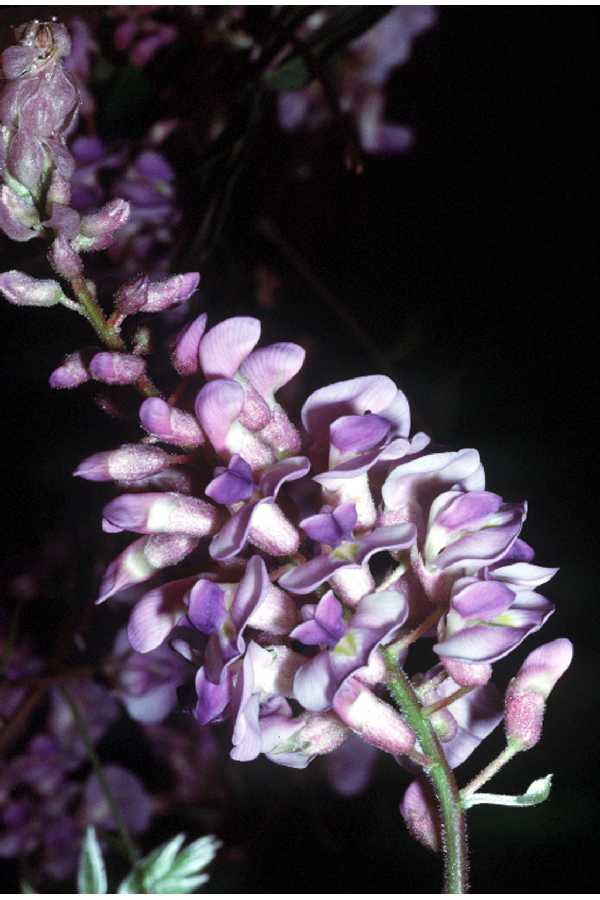

Conservation status
- Secure (NatureServe)

Scientific classification
- Kingdom: Plantae
- Clade: Embryophytes
- Clade: Tracheophytes
- Clade: Spermatophytes
- Clade: Angiosperms
- Clade: Eudicots
- Clade: Rosids
- Order: Fabales
- Family: Fabaceae
- Subfamily: Faboideae
- Genus: Wisteria
- Species: W. frutescens

Binomial name
- Wisteria frutescens (L.) Poir.

Synonyms
- Apios frutescens (L.) Pursh.; Bradlea frutescens (L.) Britton; Bradlea macrostachys (Torr. & A. Gray) Small; Glycine frutescens L.; Kraunhia frutescens (L.) Raf. ex Greene; Kraunhia macrostachya (Torr. & A. Gray) Small; Kraunhia macrostachys (Torr. & A. Gray) Small; Phaseolodes frutescens (L.) Kuntze; Phaseolus frutescens (L.) Eaton & Wright; Thyrsanthus frutescens (L.) Elliott; Wisteria frutescens var. albo-lilacina Dippel; Wisteria frutescens var. magnifica Herincq; Wisteria frutescens var. macrostachya Torr. & A. Gray; Wisteria macrostachya f. albo-lilacina Rehder

= Wisteria frutescens =

American wisteria

Species of legume

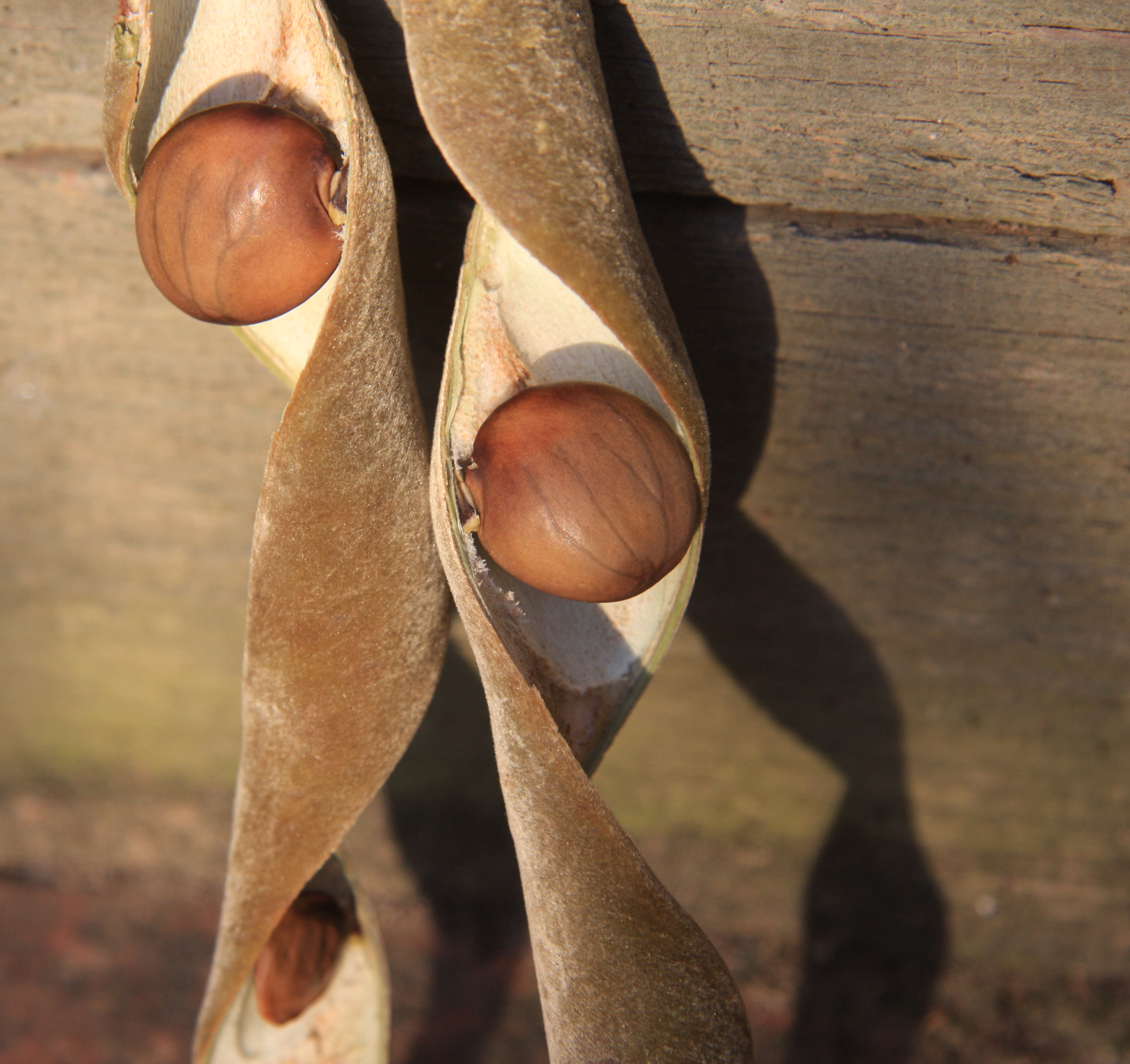
Wisteria frutescens seeds in pod halves

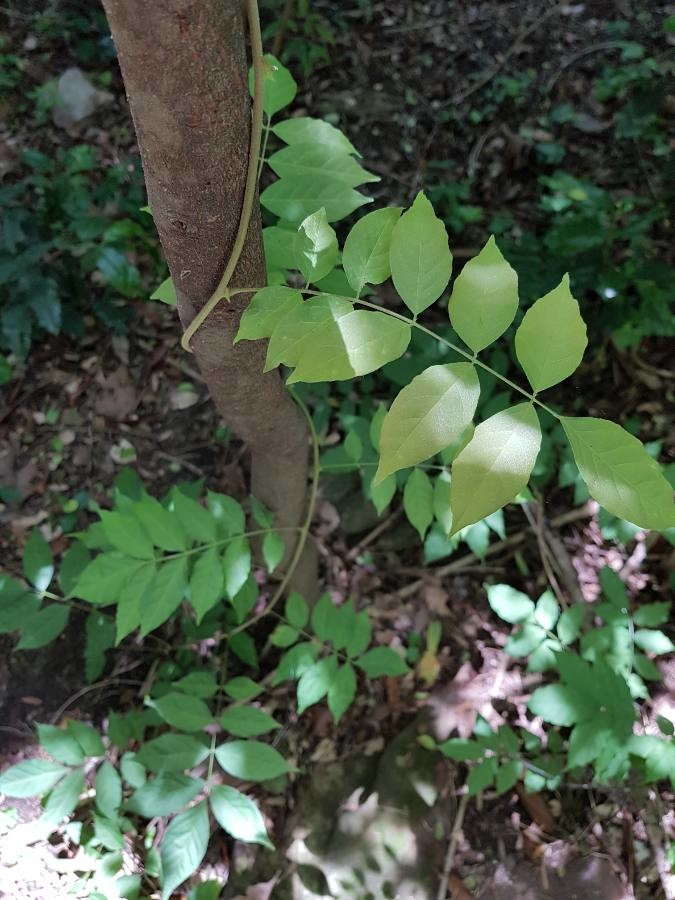
Leaves

Wisteria frutescens (common names American wisteria, swamp wisteria, Mississippi wisteria, and Atlantic wisteria) is a woody, deciduous, perennial climbing vine, one of various wisterias of the family Fabaceae. It is native to the wet forests and stream banks of the southeastern United States, with a range stretching from the states of Virginia to Texas (Northeast Texas Piney Woods) and extending southeast through Florida, also north to Iowa, Michigan, and New York.

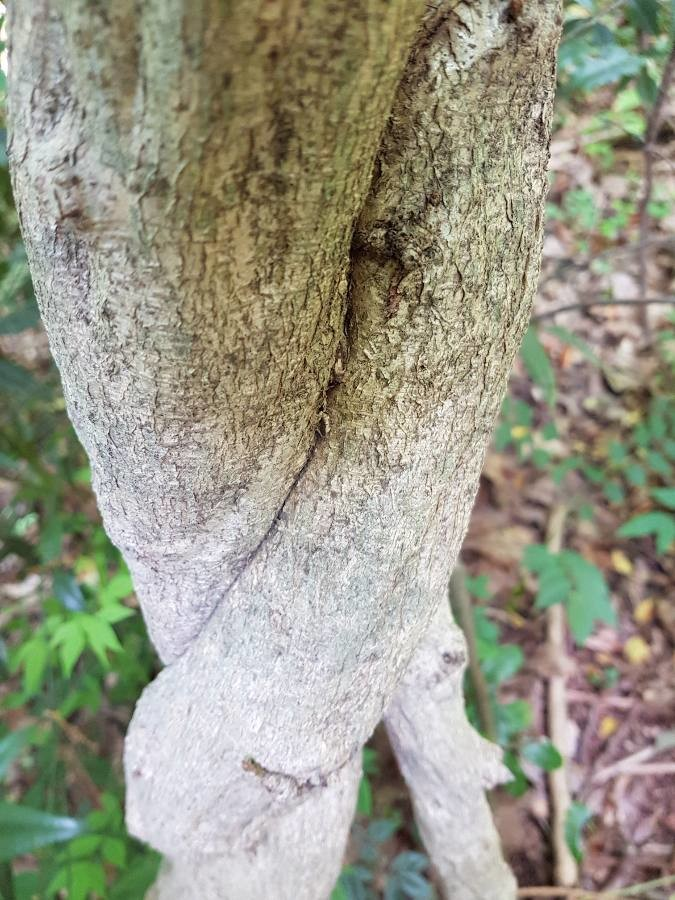
Mature bark

== Taxonomy ==
Carl Linnaeus described Wisteria frutescens.

Kentucky wisteria, Wisteria frutescens var. macrostachya is a distinctive variety found in the southeastern United States, including its namesake state of Kentucky. It has been classified as a separate species, Wisteria macrostachya (Torr. & A. Gray) Nutt. ex B. L. Rob. & Fernald.

== Description ==
American wisteria can grow up to 15 m long over many supports via powerful counterclockwise-twining stems. It produces dense clusters of blue-purple, two-lipped, flowers 2 cm (3/4 in) wide on racemes 5–15 cm (2–6 in) long in late spring to early summer. These are the smallest racemes produced by any Wisteria. Though it has never been favored in many gardens for this characteristic, many bonsai artists employ American wisteria for its manageably-sized flowers, and it is charming as a woodland flowering vine.

The foliage consists of shiny, dark-green, pinnately compound leaves 10–30 cm (4–12 in) in length. The leaves bear 9–15 oblong leaflets that are each 2–6 cm (3/4–2 1/4 in) long. It also bears numerous poisonous, bean-like seed pods 5–10 cm (2–3 7/8 in) long that mature in summer and persist until winter; the pods are fuzzy and greenish-tan when young, but shiny brown and smooth when dry. The seeds are large and brown (see image). American wisteria prefers moist soils. It is considered shade tolerant, but will flower only when exposed to partial or full sun. It grows best in USDA plant hardiness zones 5–9. In the wild, they can be found in woods, thickets, and streambanks.

Kentucky wisteria bears slightly scented bluish-purple to white flowers in racemes 15–30 cm (6–12 in) long, a generally average length for the Wisteria family.

Several characteristics distinguish American wisteria from its Asian counterparts. It grows only two-thirds as tall, its racemes are half as long (the shortest of the wisteria family), and its bloom time is sometimes shorter than many Asian varieties. Its flowers are scented, and its seed pods are smooth rather than velvety when mature.

== Ecology ==
The butterflies long-tailed skipper, silver-spotted skipper, marine blue, zarucco duskywing and the moth Cuphodes wisteriae use Wisteria frutescens as a larval host.

=== Pests and diseases ===
Wisteria frutescens, in general, is subject to few pests or diseases. It is, however, subject to damage by typical pests like aphids, leaf miners, Japanese beetles, scale insects, and mealybugs. Pests of particular concern are longhorn beetles, such as Synaphaeta guexi, and the Asian long-horned beetle. These beetles will bore into the woody stems of young or unhealthy wisteria, causing disruption of water and nutrient flow. This also allows for the potential to introduce disease, like rot, and both of these have the potential to cause death of the plant.

A fungus, Aplosporella wistariae Ellis & Barthol., has been found on some cultivars of wisteria in Louisville, Kansas. Its stromata are elliptical or orbicular, are 1–2 mm in diameter, and are sunk into the bark, which causes raised pustules, some of which are ruptured. Its perithecia are 120–150 μm and are white inside; sporules are oblong, measuring 12–16 by 6–7 μm.

Partly dead leaves of Wisteria frutescens have been found to host Phomatospora wistariae Ellis & Everh. This fungus is perithecial, meaning its fruiting body is flask-shaped with an ostiole through which its ascospores are released. It is mostly epiphytic, and it grows in relatively flat gray spots that are approximately 2–4 mm. in diameter. These spots are bounded by narrow dark lines, and frequently merge. Phomatospora wistariae is hyaline in appearance and resembles a membrane, it is sessile, it does not have paraphyses, its asci are oblong, and its sporidia are biseriate and have an oblong-elliptical shape. Its perithecia measure to about 110–120 μm, its asci 35–45 by 10–12 μm, and its sporidia 12 by 6 μm.

Rhizobium radiobacter, previously known as Agrobacterium tumefaciens and commonly as crown gall, is a soil-borne bacterium that occasionally infects wisteria, causing abnormal growths or swellings on the roots or stems. It infects the plant through its Ti plasmid, and then A. tumefaciens integrates a part of its DNA into the chromosome of the host plant's cells. The K-48 strain of the bacterium can be effectively used to prevent infection by the pathogenic strain of crown gall.

Root-knot nematodes are parasites known to affect most species of plants, wisteria not being an exception, but wisteria is susceptible to Texas root rot caused by the fungus Phymatotrichum omnivorum. Texas root rot damages the roots and prevents their absorption of water, resulting in wilting then death.

Pantoea agglomerans has been shown to induce galls on Wisteria.

Wisteria brachybotrys, Wisteria floribunda, Wisteria sinensis and Wisteria venusta are hosts for various powdery mildew species, Botryosphaeria, and Phomopsis canker and die-back pathogens, Phyllosticta wisteriae, and Septoria wisteriae. Wisteria vein mosaic virus (a variant of the tobacco mosaic virus) and subterranean clover stunt virus are the only two known viruses to infect genus Wisteria, and the potential for Wisteria frutescens to contract any of the previously mentioned diseases is undetermined.

== Toxicity ==
All species of Wisteria contain a saponin known as Wisterin in the bark, branches, pods, roots, and seeds. There is debate over whether the flowers are toxic. An unknown and toxic resin is present as well. Poisoning from the plant can occur from ingestion of 1 to 2 seed pods and results in mild to severe gastroenteritis, nausea, frequent vomiting, abdominal pain and diarrhea. This can result in dehydration and collapse in serious cases; recovery generally occurs within 24 hours. The concentration of toxins varies in all segments of the plant and varies during different seasons. Wisterin's structure has been shown to be similar in structure and in effects to the alkaloid cytisine, but less potent. It has a bittersweet taste. As with the cytisine-containing Laburnum, its leaves are sometimes taken as a tobacco substitute.

Canavanine is a common α-amino-acid constituent found in the seeds of all species of Wisteria. It serves as a defense compound against herbivores and provides a vital source of nitrogen for the growing plant embryo. The toxicity of canavanine is due to its extreme structural similarity to L-arginine, which may result in an organism's incorporation of it into proteins in place of L-arginine. This results in the production of aberrant proteins that may not function properly in the body.
