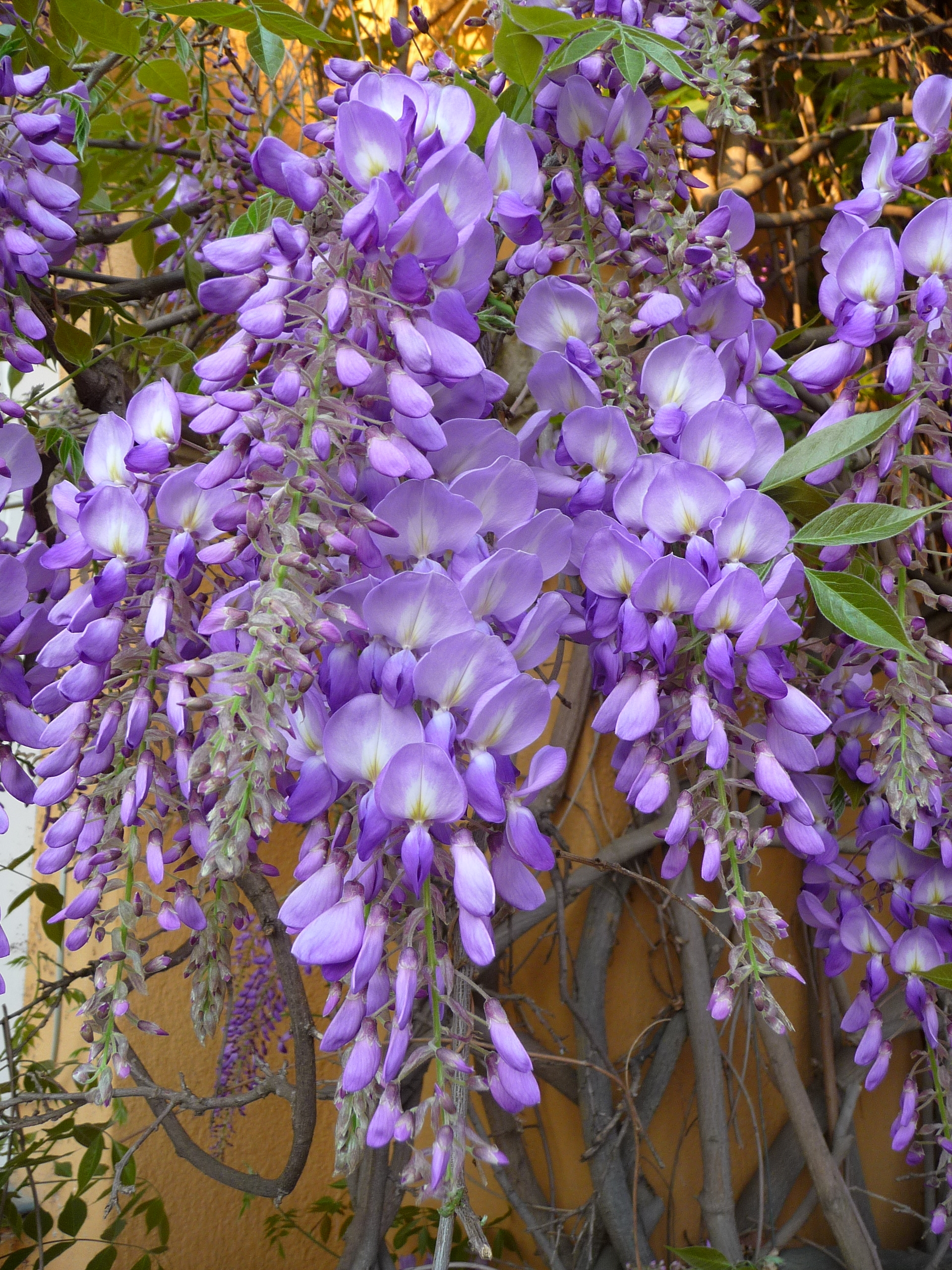
- Racemes

Scientific classification
- Kingdom: Plantae
- Clade: Tracheophytes
- Clade: Angiosperms
- Clade: Eudicots
- Clade: Rosids
- Order: Fabales
- Family: Fabaceae
- Subfamily: Faboideae
- Genus: Wisteria
- Species: W. sinensis

Binomial name
- Wisteria sinensis (Sims) DC.

Synonyms
- List: Apios sinensis (Sims) Spreng.; Glycine sinensis Sims; Kraunhia sinensis (Sims) Green; Millettia sinensis (Sims) Benth.; Rehsonia sinensis (Sims) Stritch); Wisteria consequana Sabine; Wisteria polystachya K.Koch; Glycine chinensis Sims; Rehsonia brevidentata (Rehder) Stritch; Rehsonia villosa (Rehder) Stritch; Wisteria brevidentata Rehder; Wisteria chinensis (Sims) DC.; Wisteria praecox Hand.-Mazz.; Wisteria sinensis var alba Lindl.; Wisteria sinensis f. alba (Lindl.) Rehder & E.HWilson; Wisteria sinensis var albiflora Lem.; Wisteria sinensis var brevidentata (Rehder) J.Compson & C.Lane; Wisteria sinensis var villosa Rehder; Wisteria villosa Rehder

= Wisteria sinensis =

Variety of legume

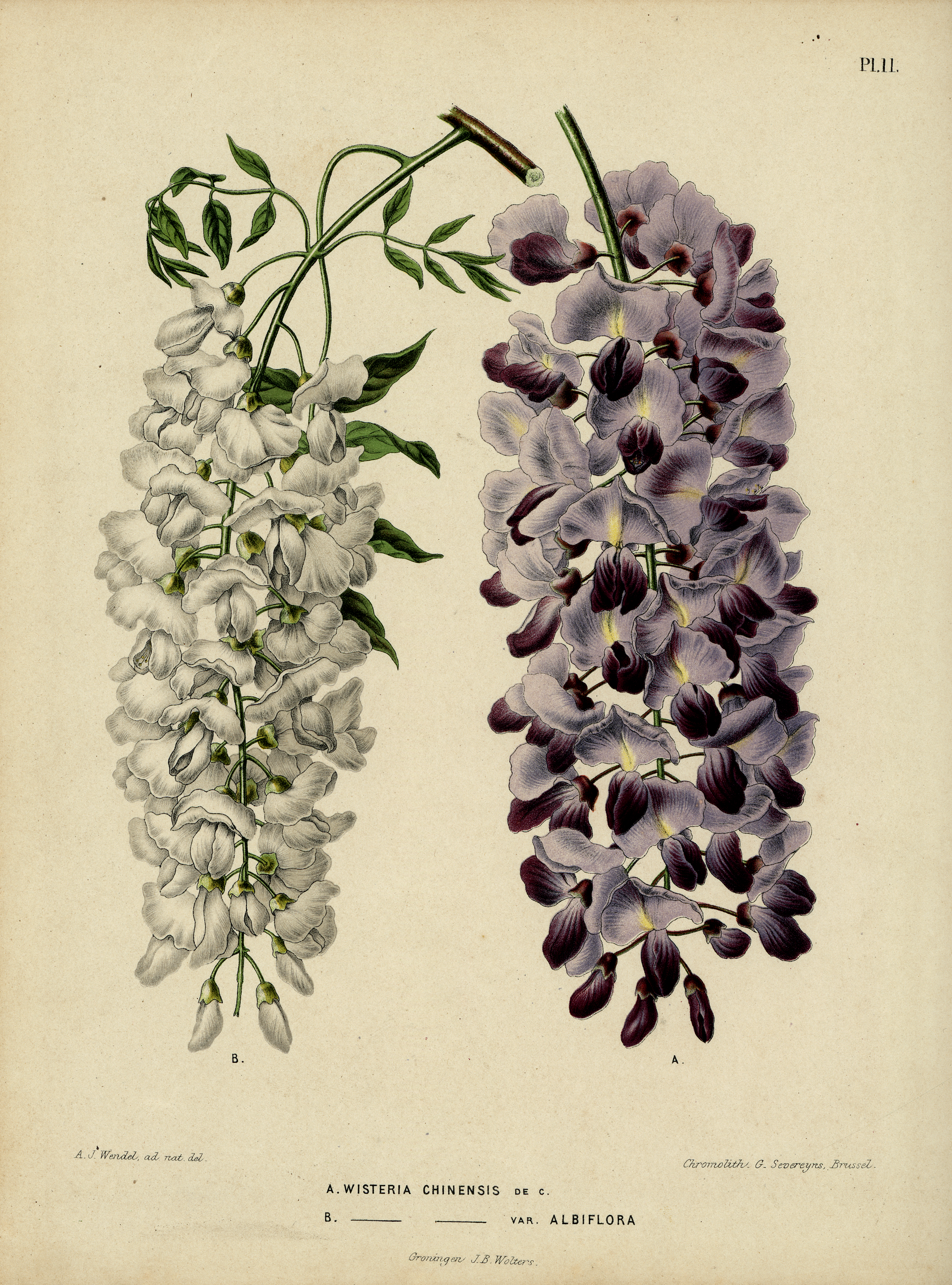
Wisteria sinensis and its variety albiflora (at the left) by A.J. Wendel, 1868

Wisteria sinensis, commonly known as the Chinese wisteria, is a species of flowering plant in the pea family, native to China, in the provinces of Guangxi, Guizhou, Hebei, Henan, Hubei, Shaanxi, and Yunnan. Growing 20–30 m (66–98 ft) tall, it is a deciduous vine. It is widely cultivated in temperate regions for its twisting stems and masses of scented flowers in hanging racemes, in spring.

== Description ==
Wisteria sinensis clings to supporting plants or man-made structures by counterclockwise-twining stems. The leaves are shiny, green, pinnately compound, 10–30 cm in length, with 9-13 oblong leaflets that are each 2–6 cm long.

The flowers are white, violet, or blue, produced on 15–20 cm racemes before the leaves emerge in spring. The flowers on each raceme open simultaneously before the foliage has expanded, and have a distinctive fragrance similar to that of grapes. Though it has shorter racemes than Wisteria floribunda (Japanese wisteria), it often has a higher quantity of racemes.

The fruit is a flattened, brown, velvety, bean-like pod 5–10 cm long with thick disk-like seeds around 1 cm in diameter spaced evenly inside; they mature in summer and crack and twist open to release the seeds; the empty pods often persist until winter. However seed production is often low, and most regenerative growth occurs through layering and suckering.

All parts of the plant contain a glycoside called wisterine which is toxic if ingested and may cause nausea, vomiting, stomach pains, and diarrhea. Wisterias have caused poisoning in children of many countries, producing mild to severe gastroenteritis.

== Cultivation and history ==
Season-impression animation of a free standing specimen at the Tsubo-en Zen garden

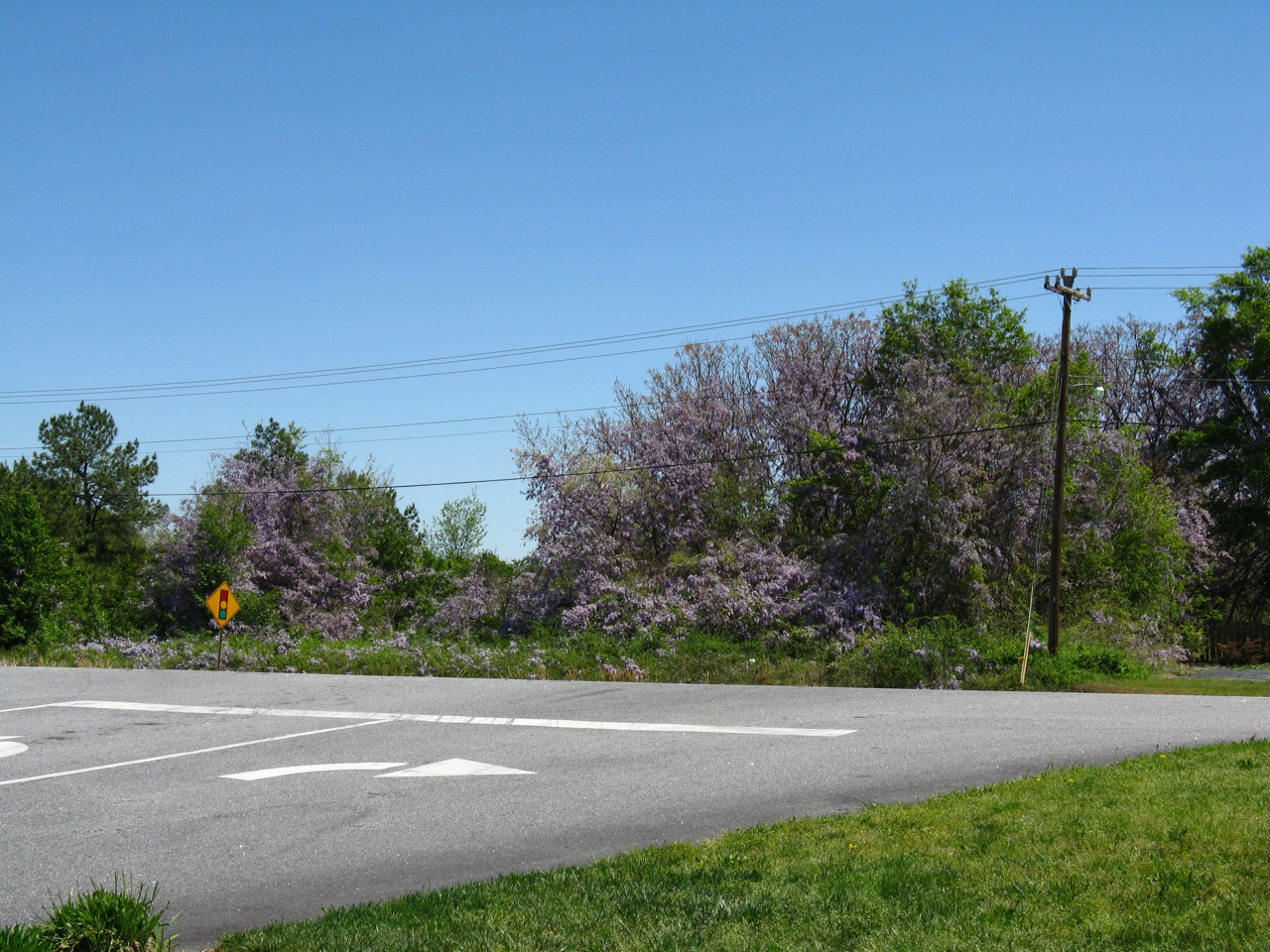
Wisteria sinensis as a weed in South Carolina, U.S.A.

Wisteria sinensis was unknown in the west before 1816, when several agents of the East India Company working in China sent cuttings back to England. Over the next several decades the plant became, and remains, one of the quintessential ornamental vines in temperate gardens worldwide. A 200-year-old specimen, growing at Griffin's Brewery in Chiswick, London, is often cited as the UK's oldest living wisteria plant.

It has become an invasive species in some areas of the eastern United States where the climate closely matches that of China.

Wisteria sinensis is most commonly trained along garden walls, along the exterior of buildings, or over a pergola to create avenues of overhanging blossoms during bloom. It may also be trained as a freestanding tree.

Chinese wisteria is more sensitive to cold than American wisteria (Wisteria frutescens) and Japanese wisteria (Wisteria floribunda). Although root hardy to USDA Zone 5 (-20 Fahrenheit), the vine can suffer serious dieback during such cold snaps. Moreover, the frequency of spring frosts in Zones 5 and 6 can kill latent flower buds, so that the plant might only bloom sporadically.

A one-acre (4,000 m^{2}) specimen Sierra Madre Wisteria, located in Sierra Madre, California is recognized by Guinness World Records as the world's largest blossoming plant. It was planted in 1892 and by 1994 had branches measuring 152 m (500 ft) long, covered an area of 0.4 ha (1 acre) and weighed 220 tonnes (48,500 lb).

== Cultivars ==
A white-flowering cultivar, Wisteria sinensis 'Alba', was discovered in a garden by botanist Robert Fortune in 1844, from which he took cuttings for the Royal Horticultural Society.

In addition to the white 'Alba', 'Prolific' features the classic purple flowers, but in greater abundance with larger racemes. It also blooms at an earlier age than the traditional cultivar. The variety 'Amethyst' has deeper colored reddish violet flowers that are extremely fragrant. The cultivars 'Prolific', 'Amethyst' and 'Jako' have gained the Royal Horticultural Society's Award of Garden Merit

== Gallery ==
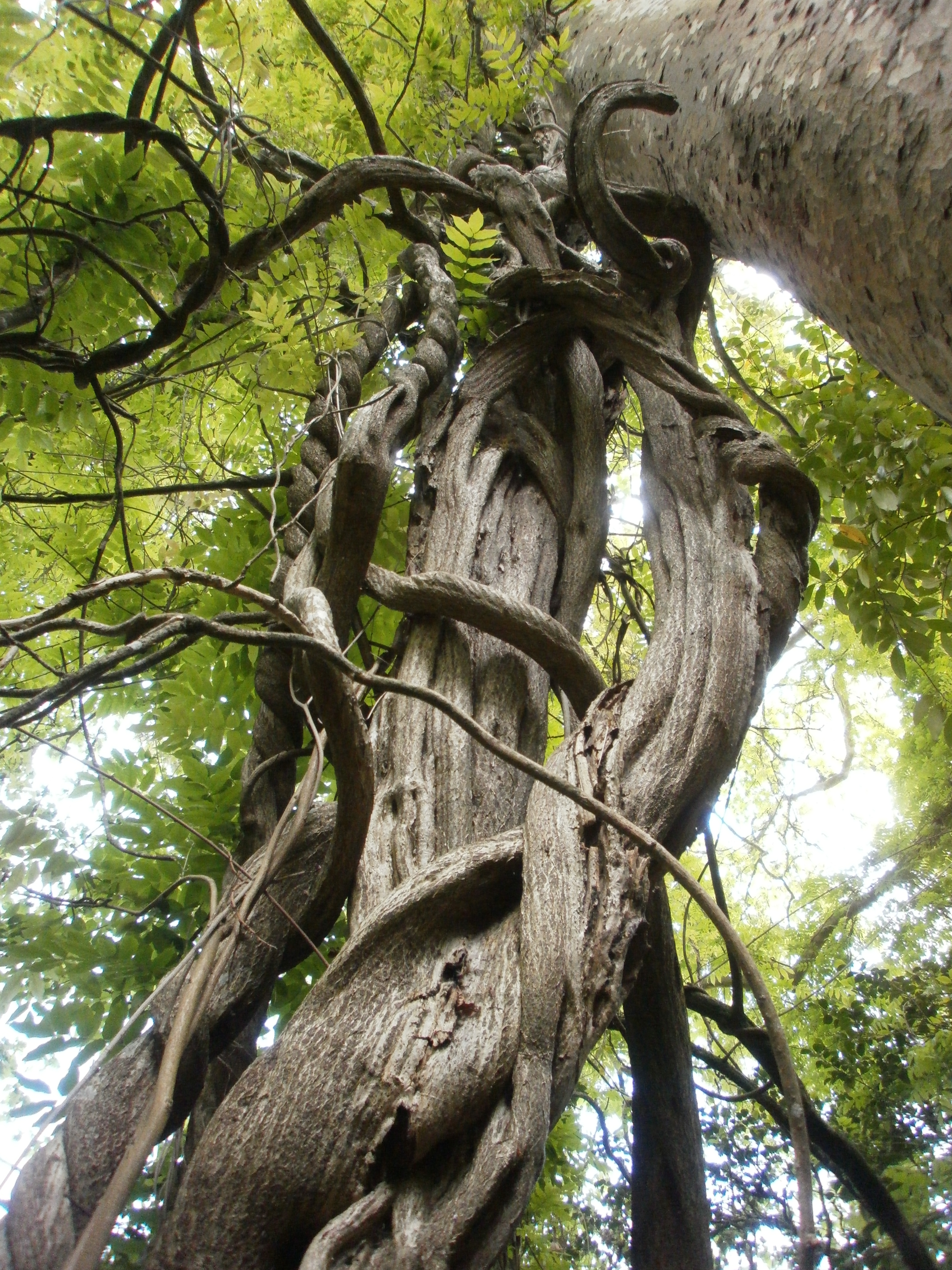
Contorted trunks

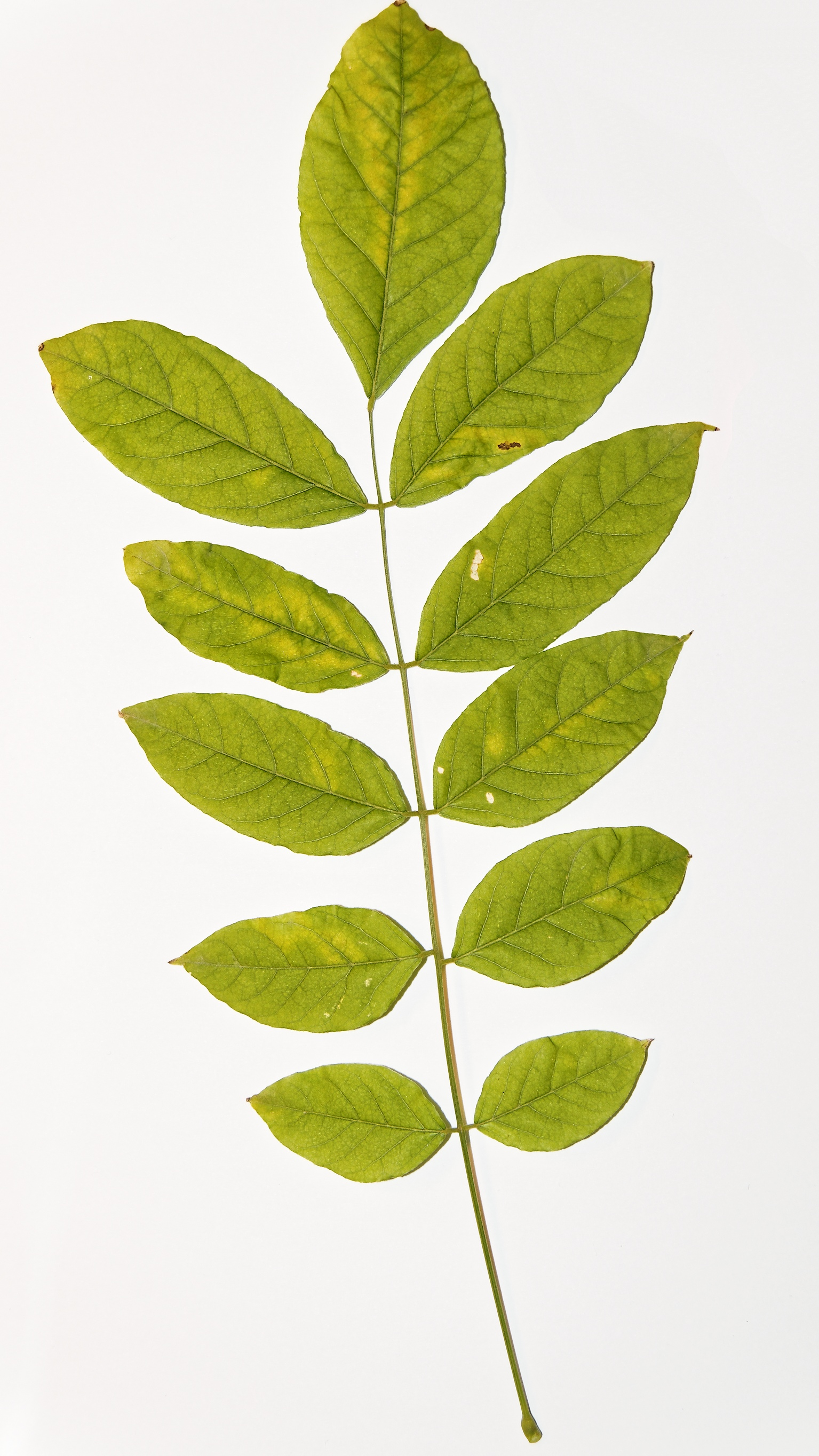
Single leaf

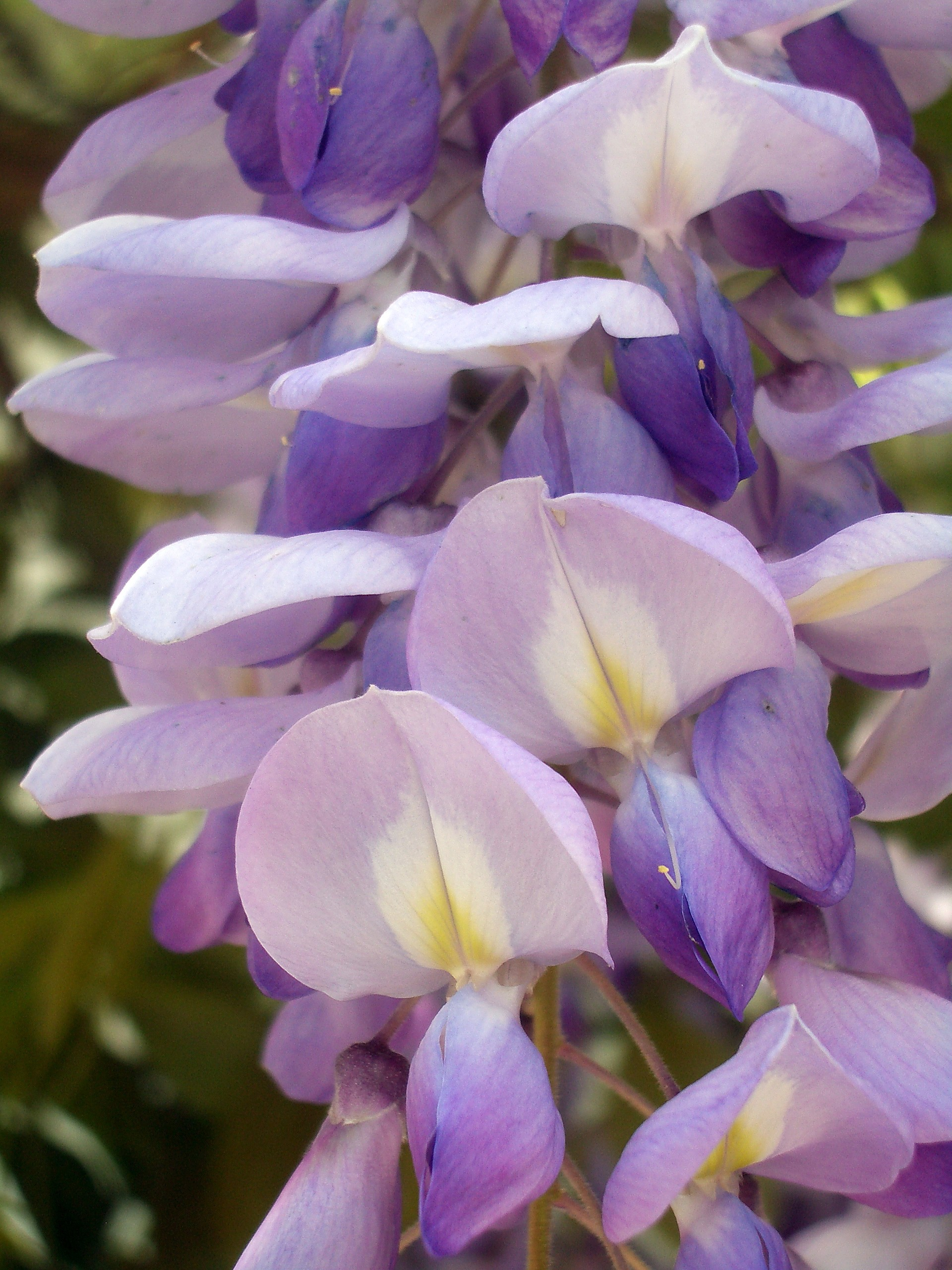
Flowers

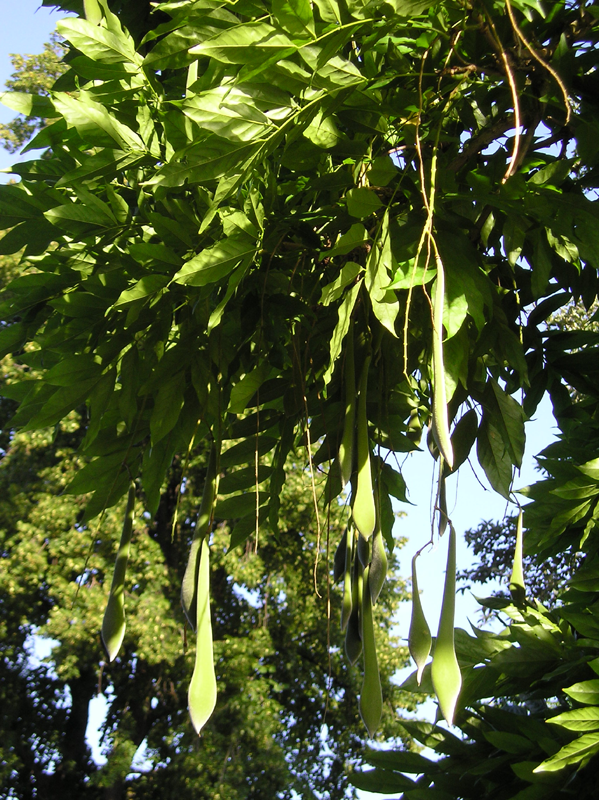
Seed pods

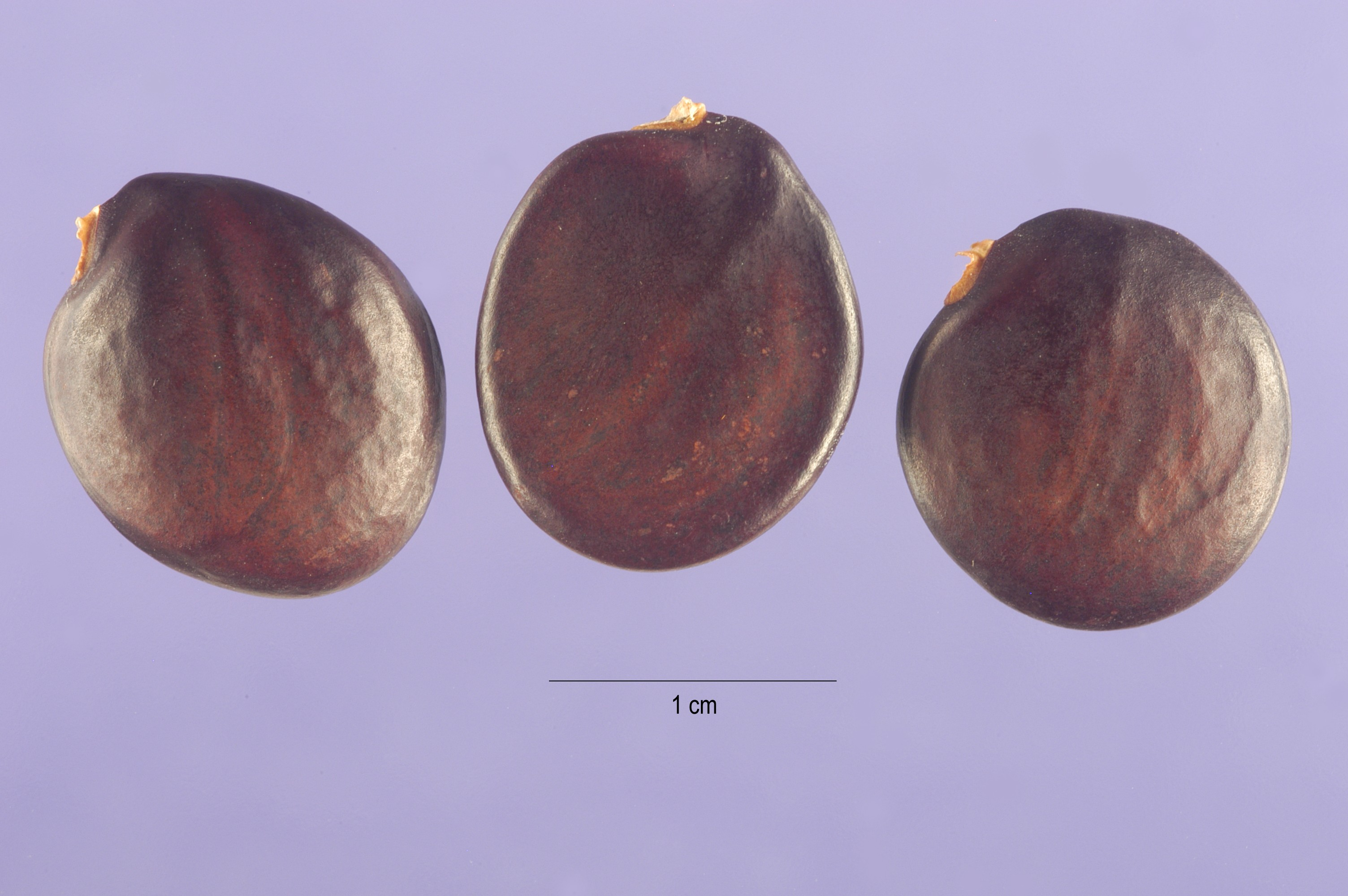
Seeds

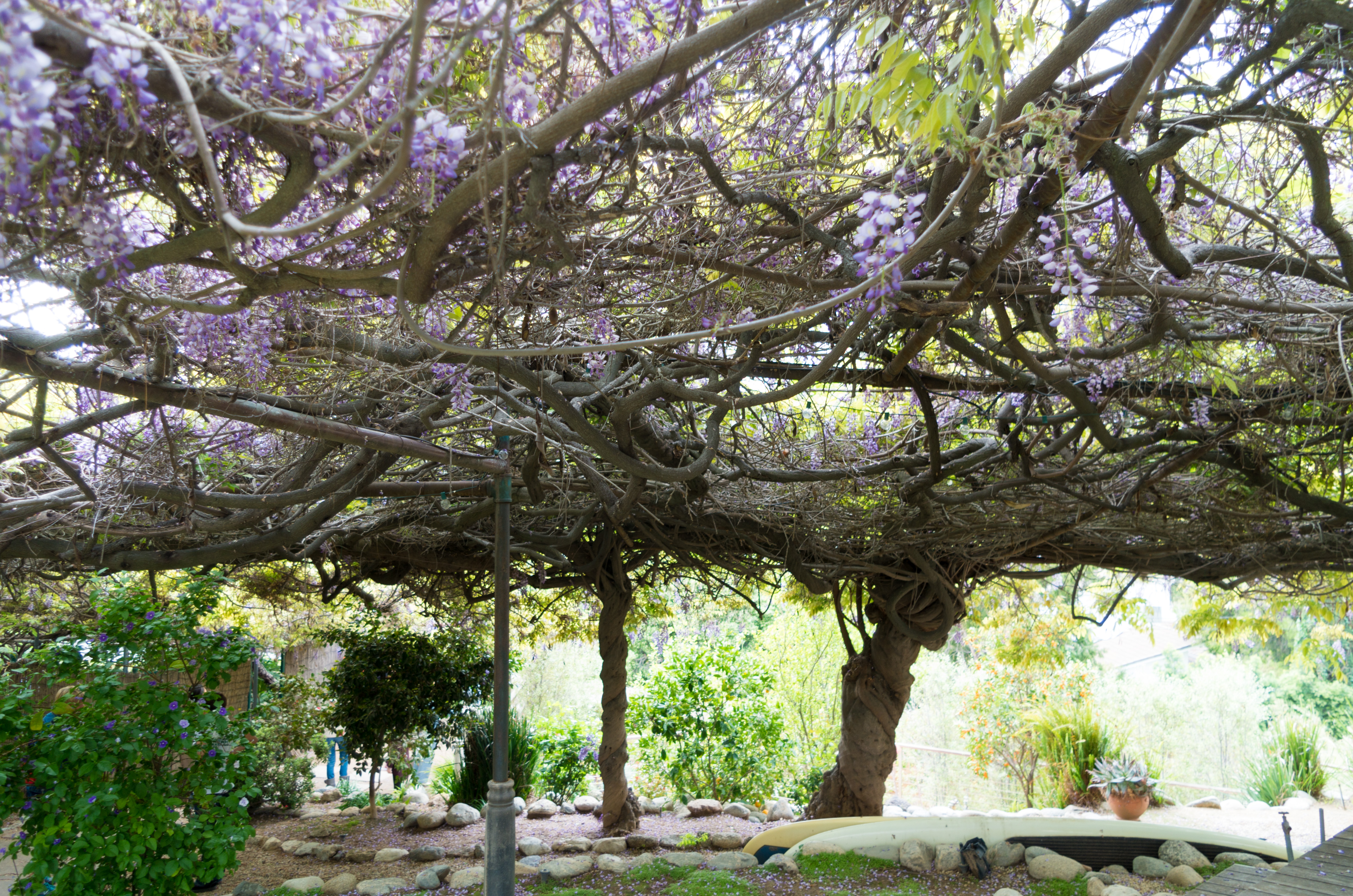
The Sierra Madre Wistaria (the preferred spelling)

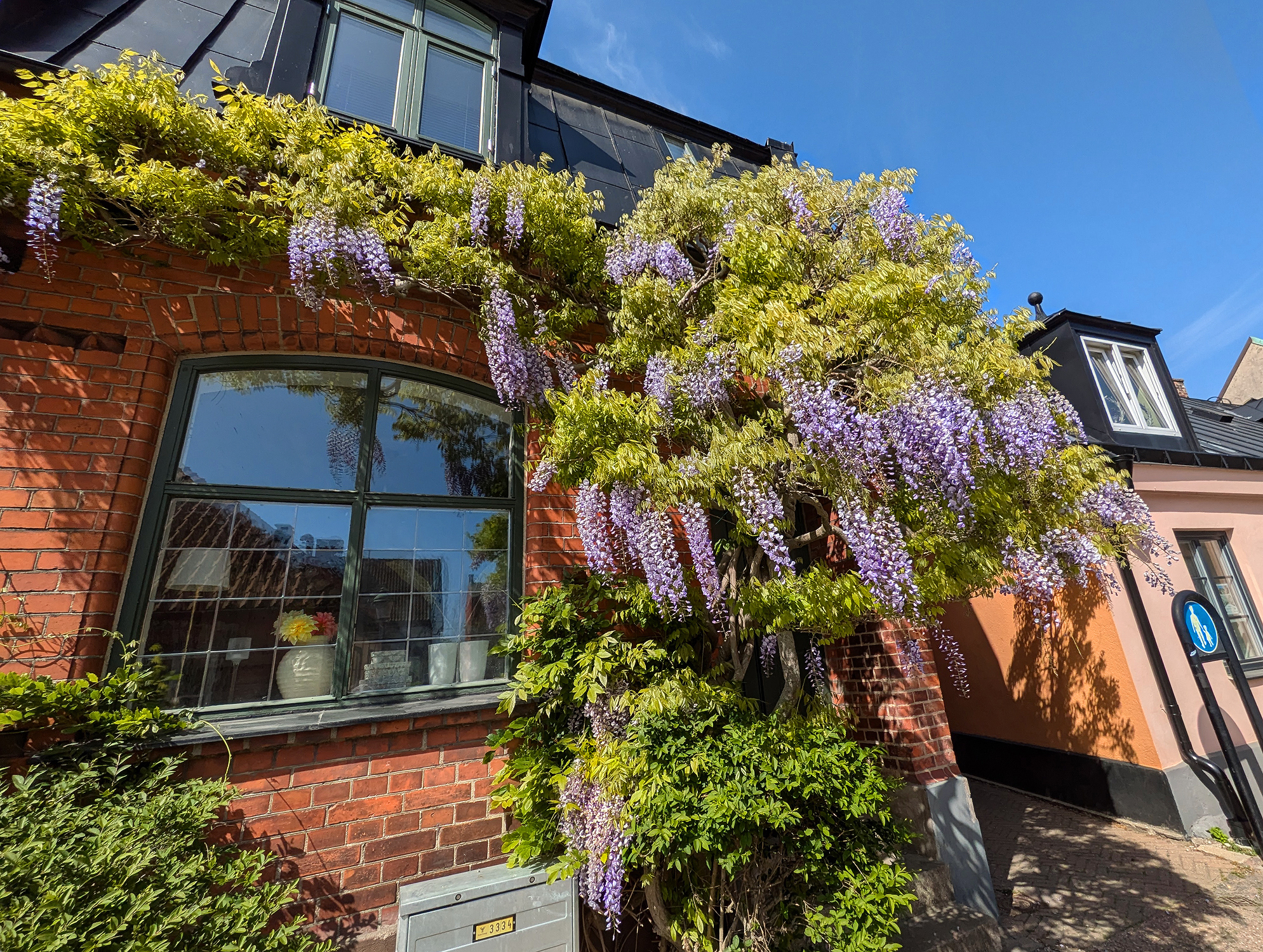
Chinese wisteria outside a street house in Ystad.
