= Thomas Nuttall =

English botanist and zoologist in America (1786-1859)

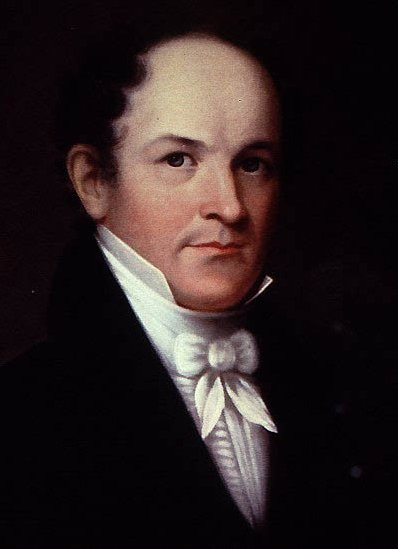
- Born: 5 January 1786; Long Preston, Yorkshire, England
- Died: 10 September 1859 (aged 73); St Helens, Lancashire, England
- Scientific career
- Fields: botanist
- Author abbrev. (botany): Nutt.
- Author abbrev. (zoology): Nuttall

Thomas Nuttall (5 January 1786 – 10 September 1859) was an English botanist and zoologist who lived and worked in America from 1808 until 1841.

Nuttall was born in the village of Long Preston, near Settle in the West Riding of Yorkshire and spent some years as an apprentice printer in England. Soon after going to the United States he met professor Benjamin Smith Barton in Philadelphia. Barton encouraged his strong interest in natural history.

== Early explorations in the United States ==
In 1810 he travelled to the Great Lakes and in 1811 travelled on the Astor Expedition led by William Price Hunt on behalf of John Jacob Astor up the Missouri River. Nuttall was accompanied by the English botanist John Bradbury, who was collecting plants on behalf of Liverpool botanical gardens. Nuttall and Bradbury left the party at the trading post with the Arikara Indians in South Dakota, and continued farther upriver with Ramsay Crooks. In August they returned to the Arikara post and joined Manuel Lisa's group on a return to St. Louis.

Although Lewis and Clark had travelled this way previously, many of their specimens had been lost. Therefore, many of the plants collected by Nuttall on this trip were unknown to science. The imminent war between Britain and America caused him to return to London via New Orleans. In London he spent time organising his large plant collection and discussing his experiences with other scientists.

== Return to the US after the War of 1812; activities and major works (1815-1841) ==
In 1815, he returned to America and after spending some more time collecting published The Genera of North American Plants (1818). In 1817, Nuttall was elected a member of the American Philosophical Society. From 1818 to 1820, he travelled along the Arkansas and Red Rivers, returning to Philadelphia and publishing his Journal of Travels Into the Arkansas Territory During the Year 1819 (1821). He was elected an Associate Fellow of the American Academy of Arts and Sciences in 1823. In 1825, he became curator of the botanical gardens at Harvard University. He published his Manual of the Ornithology of the United States and of Canada (1832 and 1834).

In 1834, he resigned his post and set off west again on an expedition led by Nathaniel Jarvis Wyeth, this time accompanied by the naturalist John Kirk Townsend. They travelled through Kansas, Wyoming, and Utah, and then down the Snake River to the Columbia. Nuttall then sailed across the Pacific Ocean to the Hawaiian Islands in December. He returned in the spring of 1835 and spent the next year botanizing in the Pacific Northwest, an area already covered by David Douglas. On the Pacific coast, Nuttall heard of the ship Alert leaving San Diego in May 1836, bound for Boston. It is here that he encountered Richard Henry Dana Jr., a former student of his at Harvard who had set sail from Boston on a two-year voyage to the California coast at about the same time Nuttall had begun his expedition. Dana wrote in his memoir, Two Years Before the Mast (1840), of his amazement at seeing his old professor "strolling about San Diego beach, in a sailor's pea jacket, with a wide straw hat, and barefooted, with his trousers rolled up to his knees, picking up stones and shells." Nuttall was taken on the Alert as a passenger along with many of his flora and fauna specimens, which he brought back to Boston to be cataloged and preserved for posterity. Dana wrote that though the professor spent much of the voyage in his cabin, he had some occasions to speak with Nuttall about his botanizing while Dana was at the helm of the ship "on a calm night" and was amused to hear his fellow shipmates refer to Nuttall as "Old Curious" for all the curiosities he conveyed on board. Once around the Horn, some of the sights on the trip through the South Atlantic prompted Nuttall to emerge from his quarters: upon sighting Isla de los Estados off the tip of Cape Horn, Nuttall told the Captain of the Alert that he would have liked to explore that place; and Nuttall also enjoyed the sight of dolphins swimming near the ship.

From 1836 until 1841, Nuttall worked at the Academy of Natural Sciences in Philadelphia. During this time he made contributions to the Flora of North America being prepared by Asa Gray and John Torrey. The death of his uncle then required Nuttall to return to England. By terms of his uncle's will, to inherit the property, Nuttall had to remain in England for nine months of each year. His North American Sylva: Trees not described by F. A. Michaux, which was the first book to include all the trees of North America, was finished just before he left the US in December 1841.

== Later ==
From 1842 until his death in 1859 Nuttall lived at Nutgrove Hall in St Helens, Lancashire, built by printer Jonas Nuttall in 1810. Nuttall is buried at Christ Church in the nearby village of Eccleston.

== List of selected publications ==
- Nuttall, T. 1817. Observations on the genus Eriogonum, and the natural order Polygoneae of Jussieu. Part 1. Journal of the Academy of Natural Sciences of Philadelphia 1(2), 24–31. (BHL link)
- Nuttall, T. 1817. Observations on the genus Eriogonum, and the natural order Polygoneae of Jussieu. Part 2. Journal of the Academy of Natural Sciences of Philadelphia 1(3), 33–37. (BHL link)
- Nuttall, T. 1817. An account of two new genera of plants, and of a species of Tillaea and Limosella, recently discovered on the banks of the Delaware, in the vicinity of Philadelphia. Journal of the Academy of Natural Sciences of Philadelphia 1(6), 111–123. (Read September 16, 1817) (BHL link)
- Nuttall, T. 1817. Description of Collinsia, a new genus of plants. Journal of the Academy of Natural Sciences of Philadelphia 1(6), 189–192. (BHL link)
- Nuttall, Thomas (1818). The Genera of North American Plants: And a Catalogue of the Species, to the Year 1817. Vol. 1. Philadelphia: Nuttall. ISBN 9780608408859.
- Nuttall, Thomas (1818). The Genera of North American Plants: And a Catalogue of the Species, to the Year 1817. Vol. 2. Philadelphia: Nuttall.(both volumes also available here at BHL)
- Nuttal, Thomas (1821) "A journal of travels into the Arkansa territory, during the year 1819 : with occasional observations of the manners of the aborigines; illustrated by a map and other engravings". Internet Archive. 23 October 2016.

== Named after him ==
The World Register of Marine Species lists 44 marine genera and species named after him with the epithet nuttalli. Various plants and birds were named after Nuttall, including Nuttall's woodpecker Dryobates nuttallii by his friend William Gambel, and yellow-billed magpie Pica nuttalli and common poorwill Phalaenoptilus nuttallii by John James Audubon. He is also commemorated in the Pacific dogwood Cornus nuttallii, Nuttall's larkspur Delphinium nuttallianum, Nuttall's oak Quercus texana, the catclaw briar Mimosa nuttallii, Nuttall's violet Viola nuttallii, Nuttall's saltbush Atriplex nuttallii, Nuttall's rayless goldenrod Bigelowia nuttallii, and other plants.

The Nuttall Ornithological Club of Cambridge, Massachusetts, is named after him.

== See also ==
- Sierra Madre Wisteria
