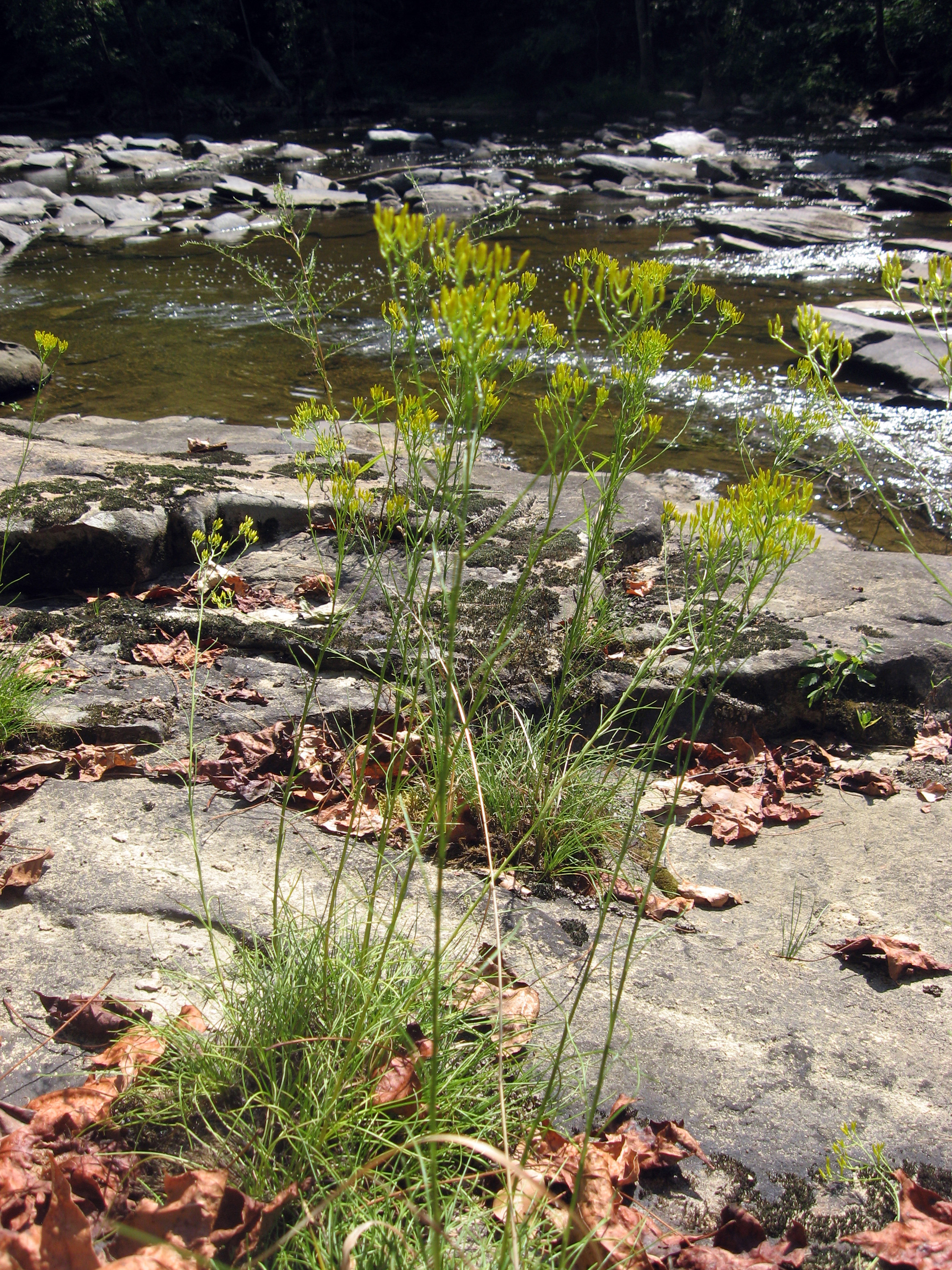
- Black Warrior River, Blount County, Alabama

Conservation status
- Vulnerable (NatureServe)

Scientific classification
- Kingdom: Plantae
- Clade: Tracheophytes
- Clade: Angiosperms
- Clade: Eudicots
- Clade: Asterids
- Order: Asterales
- Family: Asteraceae
- Genus: Bigelowia
- Species: B. nuttallii

Binomial name
- Bigelowia nuttallii L.C.Anderson

= Bigelowia nuttallii =

Species of flowering plant

Bigelowia nuttallii (Nuttall's rayless goldenrod) is a species of flowering plant in the family Asteraceae, native to the southern United States (Texas, Louisiana, Alabama, Georgia, and Florida). It can be found on sandstone or siltstone outcrops. NatureServe assigns Bigelowia nuttallii a rounded global conservation rank of G3, or vulnerable. It was described in 1970 by Loran C. Anderson.
