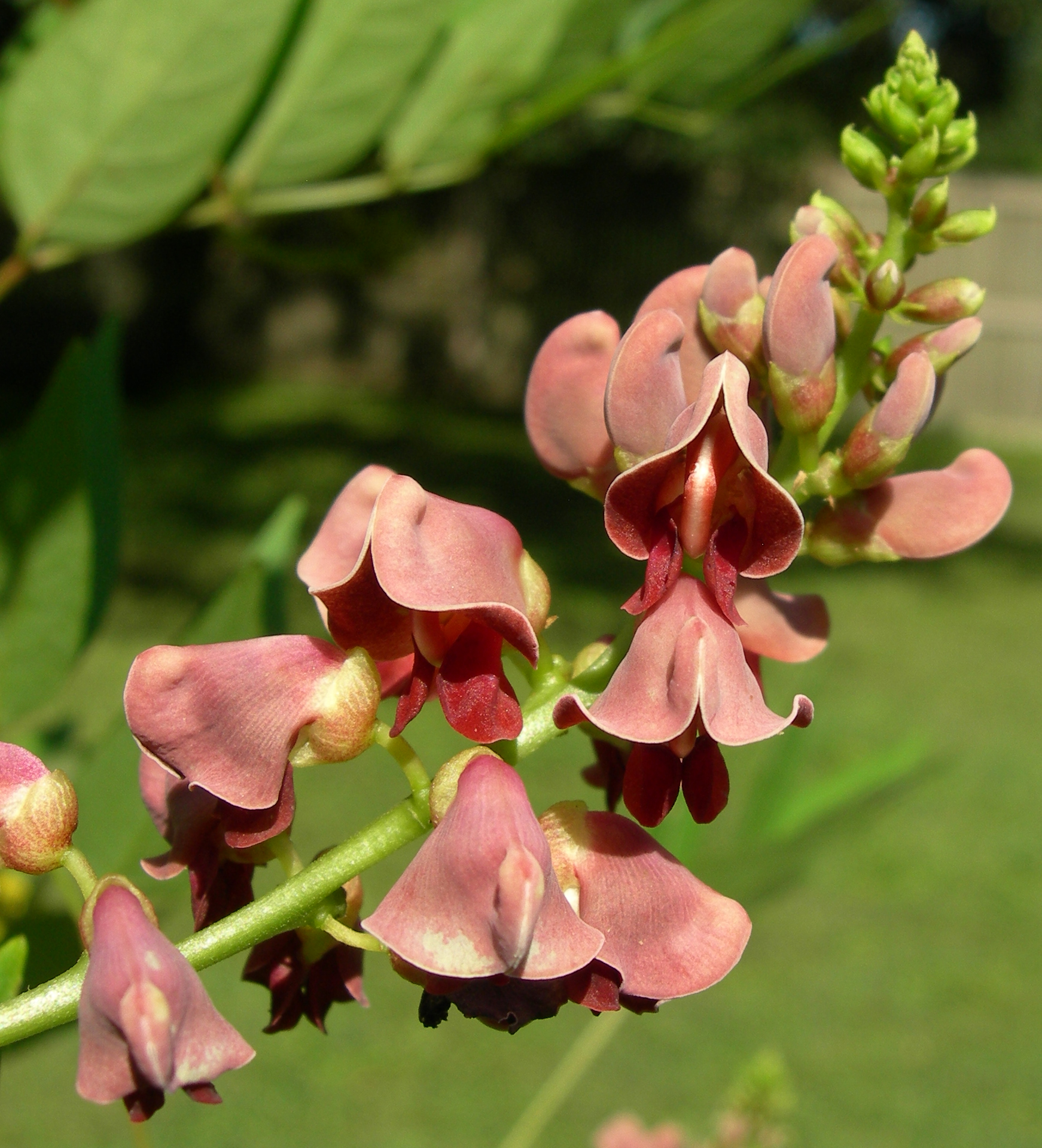
- Flowers

Conservation status
- Secure (NatureServe)

Scientific classification
- Kingdom: Plantae
- Clade: Tracheophytes
- Clade: Angiosperms
- Clade: Eudicots
- Clade: Rosids
- Order: Fabales
- Family: Fabaceae
- Subfamily: Faboideae
- Genus: Apios
- Species: A. americana

Binomial name
- Apios americana Medik.

Synonyms
- List: Apios apios (L.) MacMill. (1892); Apios perennis Vahl ex Hornem. (1815); Apios tuberosa Moench (1794); Glycine apios L. (1753); Glycine tuberosa Salisb. (1796); Gonancylis thyrsoidea Raf. (1824); Phaseolus tuberosus Eaton & Wright (1840)

= Apios americana =

American groundnut

Species of flowering plant in the pea family

Apios americana, sometimes called the American groundnut, potato bean, hopniss, Indian potato, hodoimo, America-hodoimo, cinnamon vine, or groundnut (not to be confused with other plants in the subfamily Faboideae sometimes known by that name) is a deciduous or evergreen perennial vine.

The sizeable tubers as well as the beans can be cooked and eaten. The former, having the culinary characteristics of a potato with a nuttier flavour, were of historical importance to Native Americans and European colonists.

== Description ==
In botanical terms, the tubers of American groundnut are rhizomatous stems, not roots. The vine can grow to 1–6 metres (3 1/2–19 1/2 feet) long. It has pinnate leaves 8–15 centimetres (3–6 inches) long with 5–7 leaflets.

The flowers are usually pink, purple, or red-brown, and are produced in dense racemes 7.5–13 cm (3–5 in) in length. The fruit is a legume (pod) 5–13 cm (2–5 in) long.

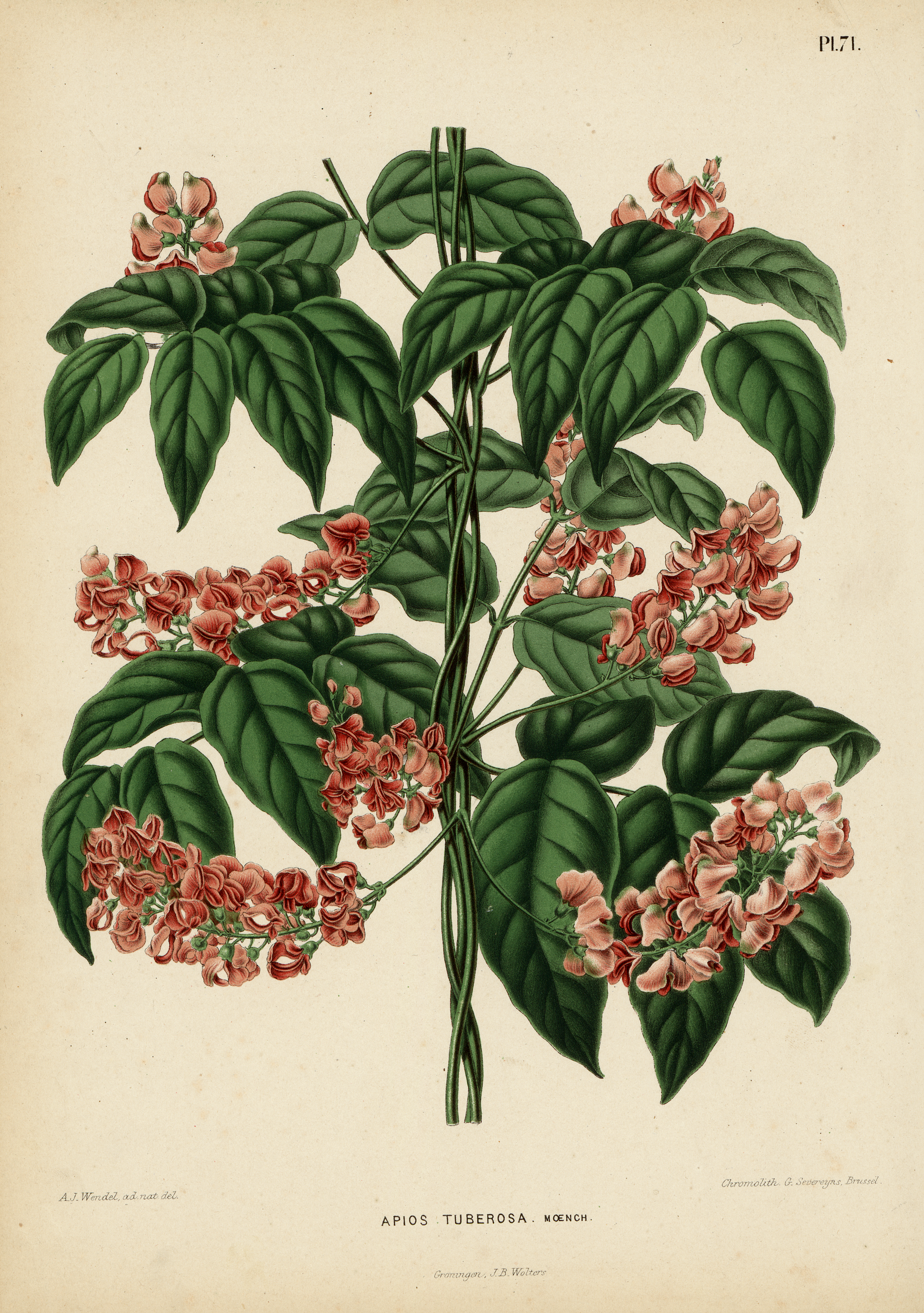
Illustration

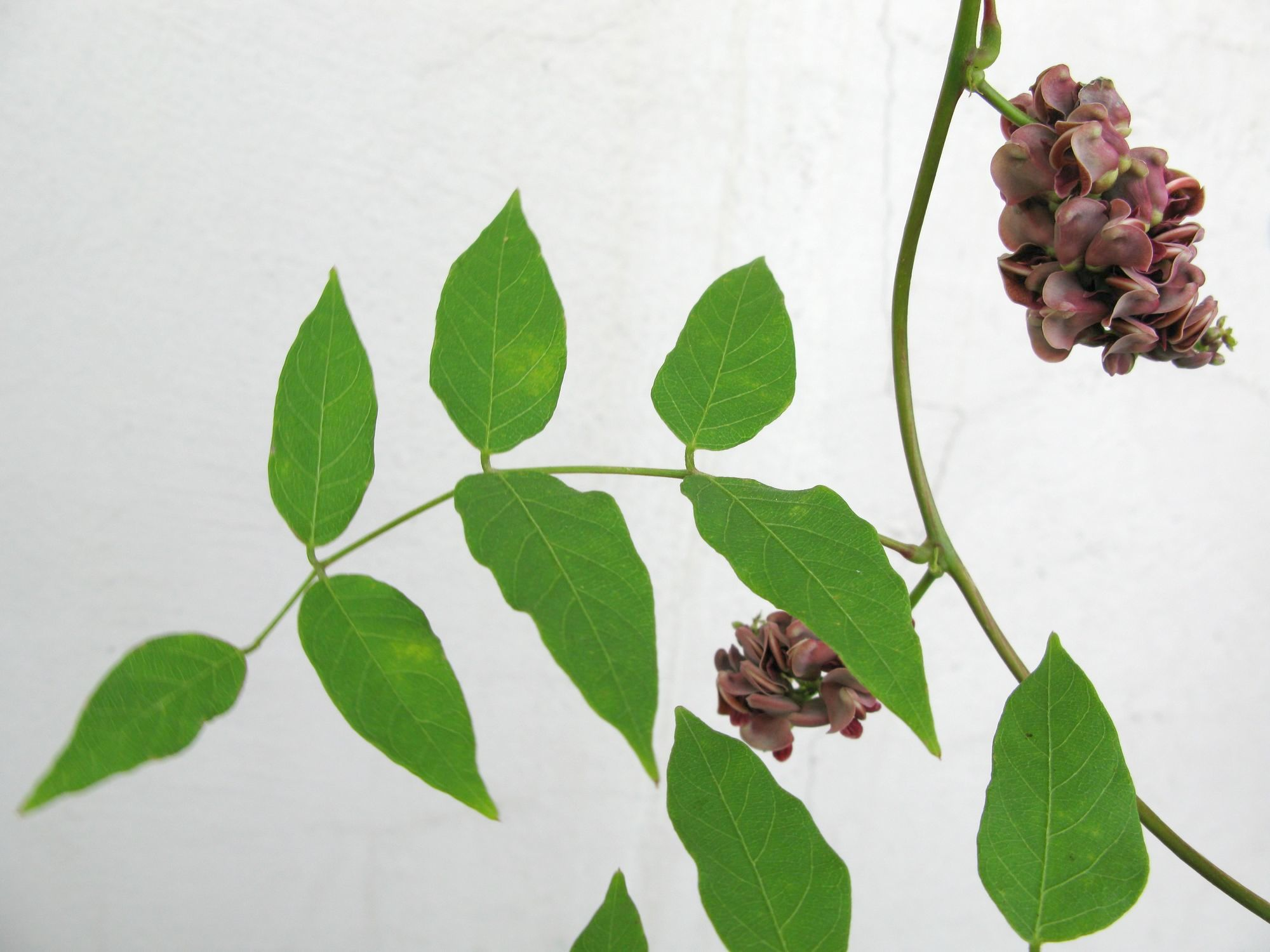
Leaves and flowers

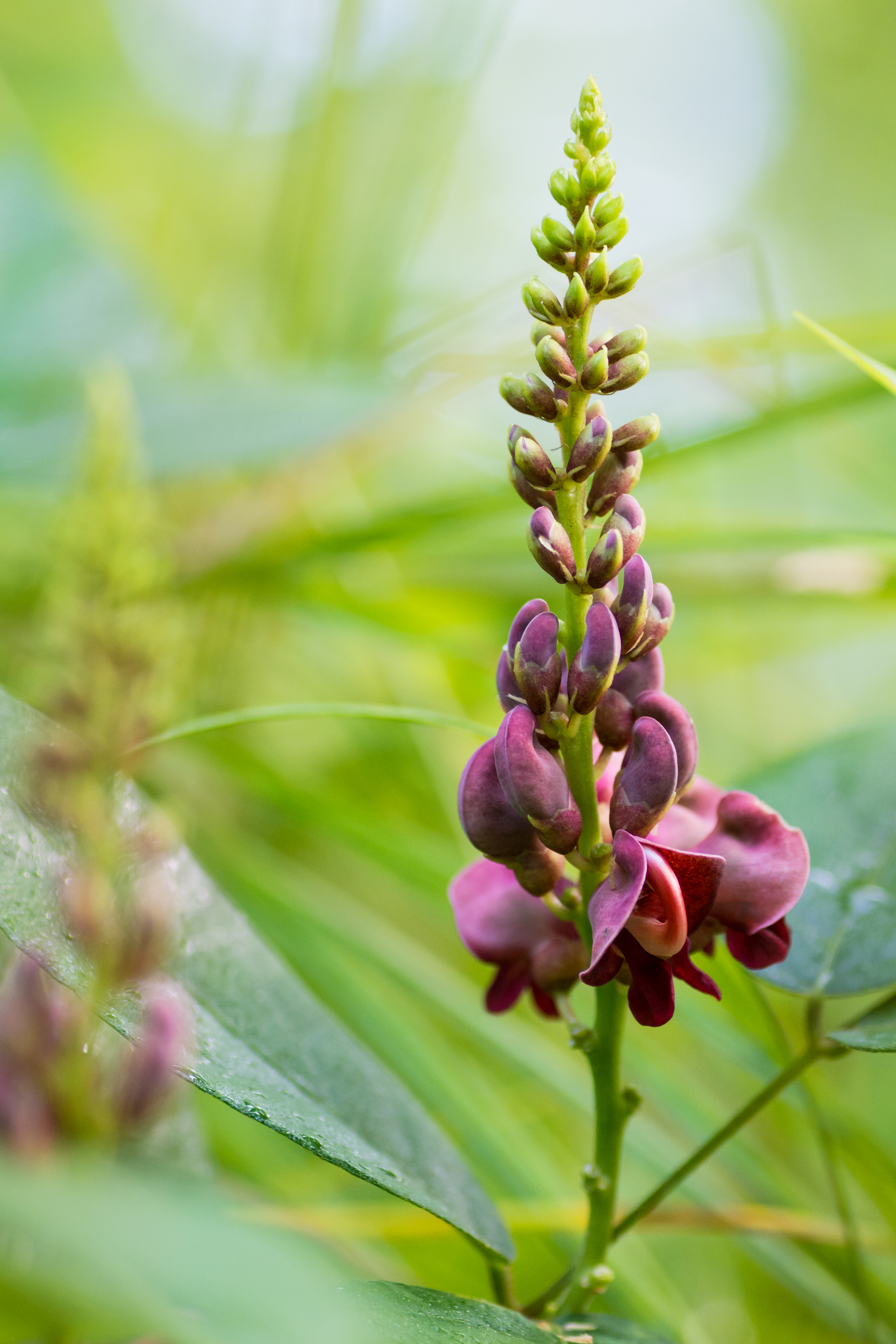
Raceme

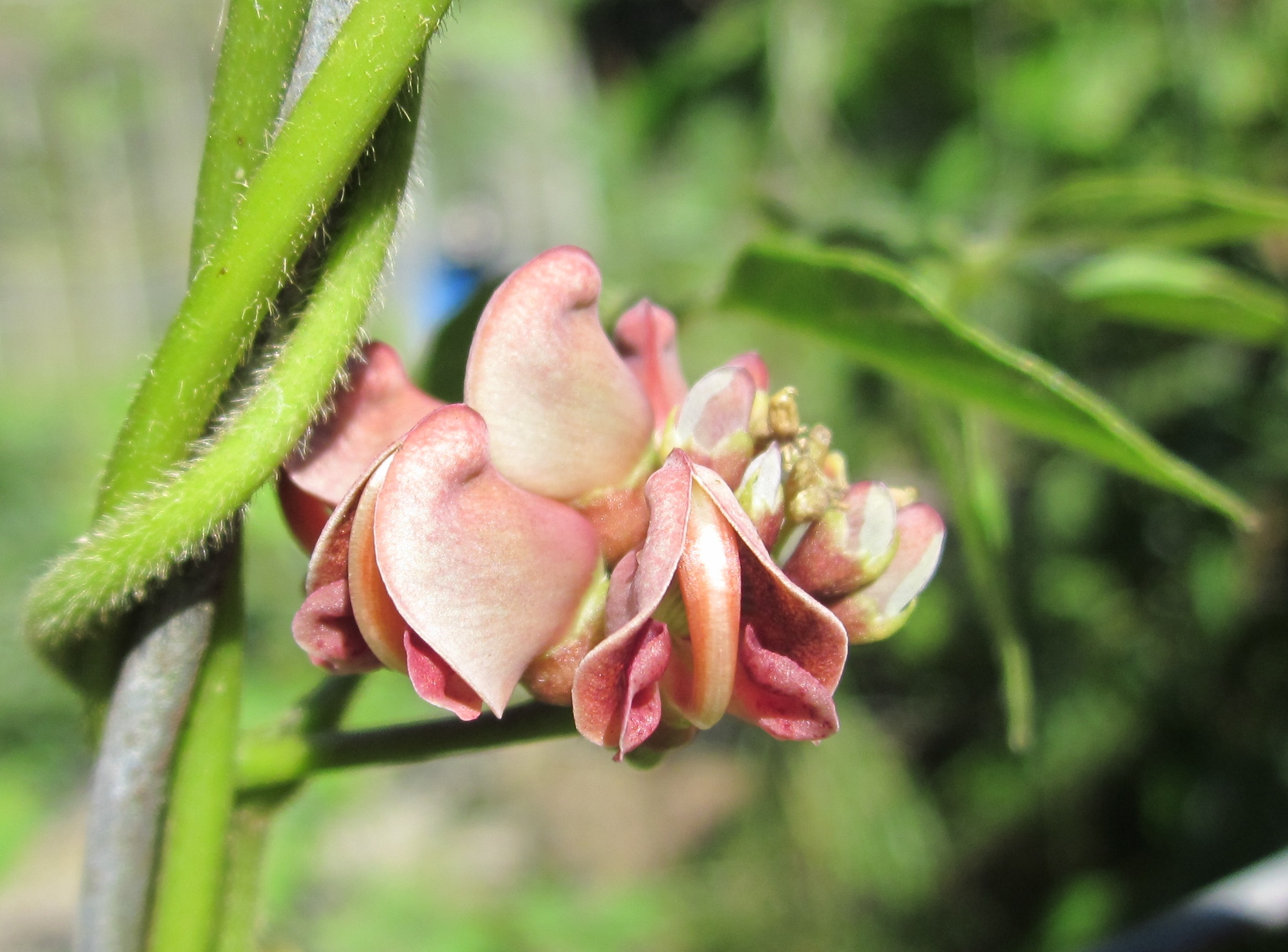
Close-up of flowers

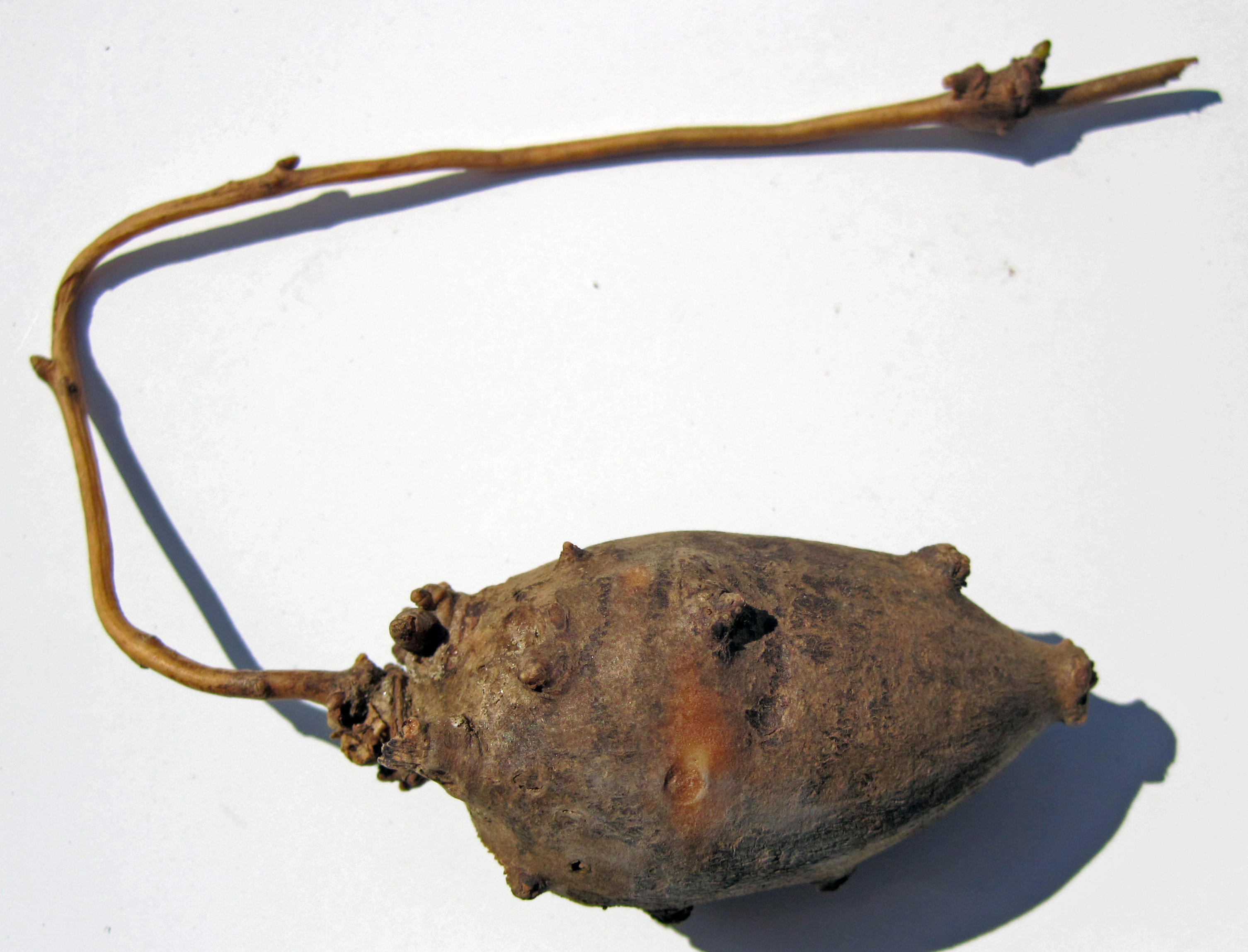
Tuber

=== Genetics ===
The species is normally 2n=2x=22, diploid, but both diploid and triploid forms exist. Only diploids are capable of producing seeds; triploids will produce flowers but not seeds. Thus, triploids are entirely dependent on tuber division for propagation whereas diploids can be propagated through both seeds and tubers. Other than seed production, there are no easily identifiable differences between diploids and triploids.

Triploids are generally found in the northern part of American groundnut's range whereas diploids predominate in the southern part of the range. Triploids have been identified in Canada (in New Brunswick, Quebec, and Ontario) and the United States (in Connecticut, Vermont, Massachusetts, New York, Pennsylvania, Ohio, New Hampshire, Rhode Island, Wisconsin, and Iowa). A few diploids have been found in the northeastern part of the range, such as along the Black River in Central Ontario. All samples tested in the Southeastern United States have been found to be diploid.

== Distribution and habitat ==
The plant's natural range is from southern Canada (including Ontario, Quebec, and New Brunswick) down through Florida and west as far as the border of Colorado.

It grows in marshes (both tidal and non-tidal), bottomland forests, wet thickets, and streambanks.

== Ecology ==
The species is a larval host for the Epargyreus clarus. Leafcutting bees from the family Megachilidae are the only pollinator that has been identified, though it has been speculated that the plant is also pollinated by flies.

=== Nitrogen fixation ===
American groundnut fixes its own nitrogen, which could be a great advantage in comparison to other roots crops, such as potatoes, true yams, and sweet potatoes. These do not fix their own nitrogen and require large applications of nitrogen fertilizer or cover cropping with nitrogen fixing plants. American groundnut can be nodulated by bacterial strains that are normally found in symbiosis with soybeans or cowpeas.

Research has been done on the potential of the soybean strain Bradyrhizobium japonicum to nodulate American groundnut. It was found that plants nodulated with B. japonicum yielded ~30% better than unnodulated plants if no nitrogen fertilizer was used. It was also determined that nodulated plants partitioned more carbon into non-edible shoots when they were given nitrogen fertilizer, whereas unnodulated plants responded to nitrogen fertilizer with greater tuber yields than nodulated plants. This data suggests that nitrogen fertilization may be required to maximize tuber size and yields in A. americana.

== Cultivation ==
=== Domestication ===
The American groundnut is generally considered to be an undomesticated crop. In her 1939 description of the Native American use of American groundnut, Gretchen Beardsley states that several historical sources describe the "cultivation" of American groundnut by indigenous peoples. She dismisses the ambiguous term "cultivation" as perhaps referring to the transplantation of tubers near a settlement. She quotes the historical author Waugh on this subject of cultivation: "sometimes planted in suitable locations, though they are not, strictly speaking, cultivated." Subsequent authors on the American groundnut have followed Beardsley's interpretation of "cultivation" when referring to the early use by Indigenous peoples of American groundnut. However, recent evidence suggests that North American indigenous peoples likely intervened significantly as cultivators of the native plants of the region, in a manner similar to contemporary Western permaculture practices. So, from a permacultural perspective, Native Americans may well have "cultivated" the groundnut. Evidence suggests the Shawnee tribe cultivated it with corn and squash as a variation of the Three Sisters method of companion planting. Apios would provide nitrogen for the heavy-feeding squash.

In 1985, Dr. William J. Blackmon, Dr. Berthal D. Reynolds, and their colleagues at Louisiana State University in Baton Rouge, Louisiana, began a program of deliberate de novo domestication of American groundnut. Their primary goal was to develop an American groundnut that can produce a significant yield in a single season. Early trials identified LA85-034 as a promising cultivar, with "elongate tubers of uniform, medium size with light brown skin and little extra rhizomatous material". By 1988, they had collected wild seeds and tubers from 210 plants found in 19 states, although the bulk of their selections came from the state of Louisiana. From these wild materials, and a small number of single crosses, they rigorously selected for plants that met their primary breeding goals of larger tuber size, denser tuber set, single season production, and productivity in untrellised cultivation. The American groundnut domestication program at Louisiana State University continued in various forms until the mid-1990s. Cultivars from this program can still occasionally be found available from small seed companies.

From 1985 to 1994, an Apios breeding program took place that resulted in the collection of over 200 wild accessions. These accessions underwent hybridization and selection, and over 2,200 lines were assessed. Of these lines, only 53 genotypes were kept for further analysis. Three different locations and three different growing conditions—field, pots, and grow-bags—were used. There was significant variation found among almost all of the 20 genotypes in the field growing condition. Inter-node length, plant vigor, and stem diameter during plant growth were positively correlated with the plant yield below ground. There were four distinct genotypic clusters found in this collection of Apios lines. Several genotypes yielded large plants in all locations, maxing up to 1.5 kilograms (3.3 pounds) of subterraneous tuber. This suggests that the plant has a good ability to adapt and grow in a wide variety of locations and conditions. Furthermore, the superior germplasm identified in this project may be suitable as cultivars, and will aid in further development of Apios lines as a crop.

The largest germplasm collection of A. americana cultivars today is found at Iowa State University under the direction of Dr. Steven Cannon. It is maintained there for scholarly and academic use. Research continues at Iowa State on the domestication of American groundnut.

Despite these efforts at domestication, the American groundnut remains largely uncultivated and underused in North America and Europe. There are challenges to breeding and domesticating this plant, as well. There seems to be a partial self-incompatibility with Apios breeding and manual pollinations, resulting in rare seed-sets. Disadvantages in Apios as a crop are its vining habit. The crop has small tuber size for most genotypes. These sizes are typically smaller than 50 g (1.8 oz); however, some do average around 100 g (3.5 oz). The tuber plant is difficult to harvest because of the "beads on a string" arrangement on stolons, which extend for over a meter.

=== In Japan and South Korea ===
The only place in the world today where American groundnuts are commercially farmed in any significant quantities is in Japan. Before the American groundnut was introduced to Japan, the people on the main island of Honshu and the northern island of Hokkaido were already familiar with a native, wild plant called hodoimo (A. fortunei), which was occasionally eaten as an emergency food. American groundnut was introduced, accidentally or deliberately, to Japan during the Meiji era (1868–1912). One theory is that it was accidentally brought to Japan as a stowaway weed among apple seedlings imported from North America. Another theory is that American groundnut may have been deliberately brought to Japan in the middle of the Meiji period as an ornamental flower.

It has become a culinary specialty of the Aomori Prefecture, where American groundnut agriculture is centered. It has been eaten there for more than one hundred years. Although American groundnut agriculture is primarily identified with agriculture in the Aomori prefecture, it is grown in the nearby prefectures of Akita and Miyagi as well. In addition, it is known to be grown in the southern part of Honshu in the Tottori prefecture. Radioactive testing records following the Fukushima nuclear disaster record cesium testing of American groundnut agricultural products in the central prefecture of Tochigi.

An important part of the spread and popularization of American groundnut consumption in Japan has been the efforts of Dr. Kiyochika Hoshikawa to promote the cultivation of this crop in Japan, and the flurry of scientific articles on the health benefits of eating American groundnut tubers. Japanese websites that sell American groundnut continue to emphasize its health benefits in their marketing efforts. There are reports of American groundnut cultivation in South Korea as well, where it is grown for its nutritional benefits.

=== Critical agronomic constraints ===
Mechanical harvesting represents the primary barrier to commercial viability. Wild types produce tubers distributed 20-100 cm from the stem along rhizomes at variable depths, while improved 'short-nodded' types concentrate tubers within 30-50 cm but still lack suitable harvest equipment. Modified potato harvesters damage thin-skinned tubers and miss irregularly positioned ones. Hand-harvest labor requirements (40-80 hours/ha) render large-scale production economically unfavorable.

The perennial establishment period requires 2–3 growing seasons for economically viable yields, delaying return on investment compared to annual crops. Vining growth habit necessitates support structures costing $2,000-5,000/ha, though the species fixes atmospheric nitrogen through rhizobial symbiosis, eliminating nitrogen fertilizer requirements. Nitrogen fixation contributes 50–150 kg N/ha annually to soil fertility.

The species exhibits excellent cold hardiness (USDA zones 3–9) and pest resistance with minimal disease pressure. Tubers contain 15–20% protein (dry weight basis)—three times potato content—and all essential amino acids, providing strong nutritional rationale for development despite agronomic challenges.

=== Louisiana State University breeding program ===
The most comprehensive domestication effort occurred at Louisiana State University from 1985 to 1994 under Dr. William Blackmon and Berthal Reynolds. The program collected over 200 wild accessions and generated more than 2,200 hybrid lines, ultimately preserving 53 elite genotypes. Breeding objectives included increased tuber size, shortened rhizome internodes for clustered production, single-season harvest capability, and reduced trellising dependence.

Improved selections achieved tubers 2–3 times larger than wild types, with some exceeding 15 cm in diameter. Yields from elite lines reached 10,000-12,000 kg/ha after establishment compared to wild-type yields of 500-2,000 kg/ha in first year and 3,000-8,000 kg/ha in subsequent years. The program demonstrated successful in vitro propagation techniques, though commercial tissue culture was never implemented. Genomic characterization identified six genotypic clusters and marker-trait associations for tuber size, architecture, and maturity.

Despite promising results, the program was discontinued without official cultivar release. Several LSU selections (including #2127, #2183, and #1972) persist in private collections and specialty nurseries. Iowa State University currently maintains the largest germplasm collection for research purposes. No formally registered cultivars exist for commercial production.

== Agroecology ==
The groundnut was an important part of the diet of Native Americans and remains a promising crop for agriculture. For example, in Europe, where the crop is still relatively unknown, its nutritional profile could make it valuable for both human nutrition and livestock feed.

The groundnut is notable for its nutritional value, multiple edible plant parts like tubers and seeds, its ability to fix nitrogen, perennial growth habit, tolerance of wet soils, and adaptability across eastern North America.

Cultivation of the groundnut could support dietary diversification, strengthen food security and contribute to resilient food systems.

=== Farming and cropping systems ===
The groundnut may be particularly interesting for subsistence smallholder farmers due to its climbing growth (limited space for food cultivation) and ability to fix nitrogen (limited input cultivation). Unlike potato and other high nitrogen requiring tuber crops, it can reduce or eliminate fertilizer need thanks to nitrogen fixation, enhancing soil nutrients and overall soil health, making it also suitable for crop rotation.

It is proposed for terrace agriculture in steep and remote areas. Groundnuts also have been cultivated in intercropping trials.

=== Ethical and societal considerations ===
From an agroecological and historical perspective, traditional knowledge associated with groundnut cultivation by Indigenous Americans should be acknowledged according to the FAO (2010). Historical records indicate that after European colonization, local regulations restricted Native Americans from harvesting groundnuts on lands claimed by colonists. Recognizing this historical context is important, along with ethical considerations such as the protection of Indigenous rights, prevention of biopiracy, and compliance with international agreements such as the Nagoya Protocol, which governs access to genetic resources and the fair and equitable sharing of benefits arising from their utilization. Its use for human consumption versus livestock feed should also be debated.

== Toxicity ==
Studies in rats suggest that raw tubers should not be consumed. They contain harmful protease inhibitors that are denatured by cooking.

== Uses ==
The tubers and seeds can both be cooked and eaten, the former in the manner of potatoes and the latter like peas.

=== Nutrition ===
The tubers are highly palatable with culinary characteristics of a potato, although the flavor can be somewhat nuttier than a potato and the texture can be finer. These tubers contain roughly three times the protein content of a potato (16.5% by dry weight), and the amino acid balance is good with the exception of cysteine and methionine. A. americana tubers were found to have a protein concentration of 15–30 milligrams per gram (0.24–0.48 ounces per pound), similar to that of other species in the genus, A. carnea and A. fortunei. However, A. americana had larger levels of genistein than the other two species. The fatty acid content of tubers is approximately 4.2% to 4.6%, with linoleic fatty acids predominating. The fresh weight of a tuber is 36% of carbohydrate (primarily starch). The tubers are also an excellent source of calcium and iron. Calcium content is tenfold greater than a potato and iron is twofold greater than a potato, although vitamin C was considerably less than a potato. The tuber and the flower also contain monosaccharides and oligosaccharides. The tuber has more of these types of carbohydrates than the soybean, potato, and sweet potato.

In addition, the tubers appear to have numerous health-promoting factors. Hypertensive rats that were fed powdered tubers as 5% of their total diet had a 10% decrease in blood pressure and also a reduction in cholesterol and triglycerides. It has been shown that the tubers contain genistein and other isoflavones that have various health benefits, including an anti-carcinogenic function against colon, prostate, and breast cancer. Genistein-7-O-gentiobioside is a novel isoflavone that is found in the American groundnut. Extract from the American groundnut was shown to drive the anti-oxidative pathway in cells although it did not have antioxidative activity itself. Human breast carcinoma MCF-7 cells were pretreated with the extract of A. americana for 24 hours. Subsequent analysis showed an increase in expression of heme oxygenase-1, a protein induced during oxidative stress. The American groundnut, like soybean, is a great source of isoflavone.

Furthermore, a study on A. americana and its flower shows that the flower of the particular plant is not toxic to mice. Consumption of the flower was shown to lower plasma glucose levels in diabetic mice. The flower was shown to have an inhibitory activity on maltose and an anti-hyperglycemic effect in mice, suggesting that not only is it a viable and novel food source for the general population, but also in the prevention of diabetes.

=== By Native Americans ===
The tubers have traditionally been a staple food among most Indigenous peoples of the Americas within the natural range of the plant. In 1749, the travelling Swedish botanist Peter Kalm wrote, "Hopniss or Hapniss was the Indian name of a wild plant, which they ate at that time... The roots resemble potatoes, and were boiled by the Indians who ate them instead of bread." In 1612, William Strachey noted of the Indigenous peoples in Virginia that "In June, July, and August they feed upon roots of tockohow, berries, groundnutts, fish, and greene wheate..." In Eastern Canada, the Jesuit missionary, Le Jeune, observed that the Indigenous peoples there would, "eat, besides, roots, such as the bulbs of the red lily [and] another that our French people call 'Rosary' because it is distinguished by tubers in the form of beads". The early author Rafinesque observed that the Cree were cultivating the plant for both its tubers and seeds. The author Daniel G. Brinton wrote in 1885 in regards to the Lenape people, "Of wild fruits and plants they consumed the esculent and nutritious tubers on the roots of the Wild Bean, Apios tuberosa... which the Indians called hobbenis..."

In 1910, Parker writes that the Haudenosaunee were consuming significant quantities of groundnuts up until about thirty years before his writing. The Paris Documents of 1666 record that the sixth tribe of the second division of the Haudenosaunee were identified as, "that of the Potatoe, which they call Schoneschironon" and an illustration of tubers is found in the Paris Documents with the explanation, "This is the manner they paint the tribe of the Potatoe." The author Gilmore records the use of groundnuts by the tribes of the Missouri river region, and the authors Prescott and Palmer record its use among the Sioux. The Indigenous peoples would prepare the tubers in many different ways, such as frying them in animal fat or drying them into flour. Many tribes peel them and dry them in the sun, such as the Menomini who have traditionally built scaffolds of cedar bark covered with mats to dry their tubers for winter use. The Menomini are recorded as having dried the tubers in maple syrup or making a preserve of Groundnut tubers by boiling them in maple syrup. The Potawatomi have traditionally boiled their tubers. The traditional Meskwaki and Ojibwe preparation involves peeling, parboiling, slicing, and drying the tubers. The Ojibwe have historically used them as a sort of seasoning in all their foods.

=== By Europeans ===
European colonists learned to use the American groundnut from the Indigenous peoples of the Americas. As a result, the American groundnut became interwoven with the history of the American colonies and Europe. The early traveler John Brereton was sustained by the "good meat" and "medicinable" qualities of American groundnut during his travels in New England in 1602. In 1613, the followers of Biencourt at Port-Royal ate the tubers to help them survive in the New World. The American groundnut was an important factor in the survival of the Pilgrims during the first few winters of their settlement. In 1623, the Pilgrims, "having but a small quantity of corn left", were "enforced to live on groundnuts... and such other things that the country afforded... and were easily gotten". The Wampanoag people taught the Pilgrims how to find and prepare American groundnut. The groundnut was likely eaten at the harvest festival of November 1621 that is regarded as the first Thanksgiving, although only venison was specifically named as a food item at this meal by a Pilgrim eyewitness account.

Philosopher Henry David Thoreau commented on the nutty flavor and dry texture in October 1852.

It is believed that American groundnut may have been shipped to Europe as early as 1597. In 1885, it was listed as a European garden crop. In 1845, it was evaluated as a possible alternative potato crop in Ireland during the Great Famine. These early introductions to Europe appear to have resulted in little or no assimilation of the new food into the European diet. A primary reason for this lack of assimilation was that the two-year cycle for an acceptable tuber yield did not match the cropping systems that were familiar to Europeans.
