= Food diversity =

Food diversity may refer to:

- Food biodiversity
- Dietary diversity
