= Agricultural diversification =

Re-allocation of farming resources

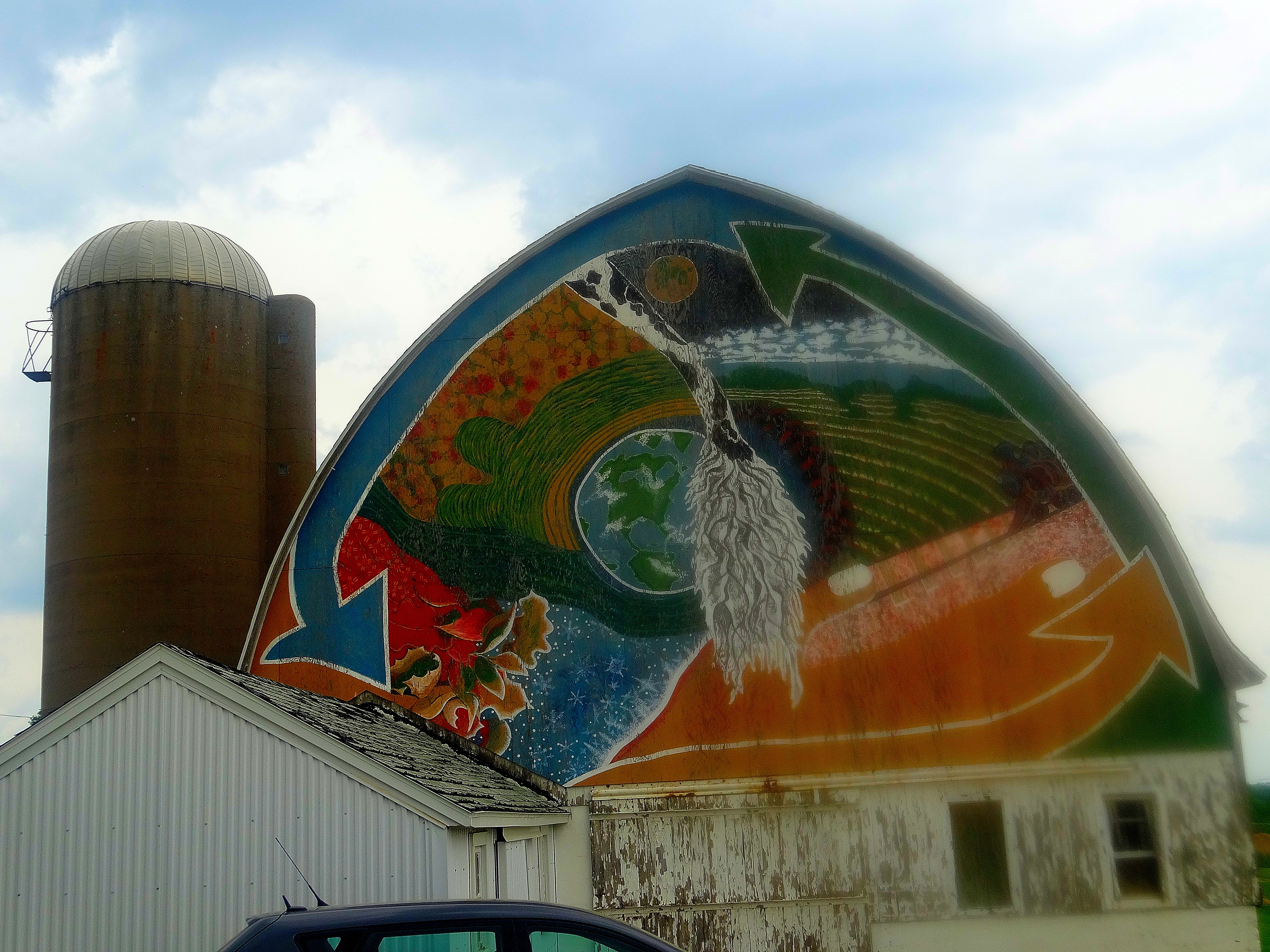
A Painted Barn

In the agricultural context, diversification can be regarded as the re-allocation of some of a farm's productive resources, such as land, capital, farm equipment and labour to other products and, particularly in richer countries, to non-farming activities such as restaurants and shops. Factors leading to decisions to diversify are many, but include: reducing risk, responding to changing consumer demands or changing government policy, responding to external shocks and, more recently, as a consequence of climate change.

== Definitions of diversification ==
Agricultural diversification refers to practices that add functional biodiversity across spatial and temporal scales in production landscapes, with the aim of restoring biotic interactions that support ecosystem services and yield stability. There are different types of diversification that can be used as tools to reach different outcomes. These include structural, genetic, temporal, landscape level, or microbial.

== Practices and techniques ==
Common diversification practices include crop diversification (intercropping, rotations, and cultivar mixtures), organic soil amendments (compost, manure, and biochar), reduced till, integrated crop-livestock systems, and targeted microbial inoculation (such as nitrogen fixing bacteria). Each practice targets different ecosystem functions and is often combined in multi-practice systems.

=== Crop diversification ===
Crop diversification occurs when more than one type of crop is grown in an area. This agriculture practice helps reduce the overall risk of farming, as the risk is spread out over a wider range of crops, helping mitigate the fallout in case of weather shocks, economic hardships, or poor growing seasons. Crop diversification has also shown to improve water quality, pollination, pest regulation, and maintain the level of nutrients in soil through carbon sequestration.

=== Organic soil amendments ===
The use of soil amendments has become a global strategy employed to mitigate the effects of climate change in agriculture as it helps restore carbon depleted soils. Organic soil amendments are a renewable resource used to supplement soil with all the nutrients that crops need to thrive by improving soil quality. These most typically come in the form of animal manures, seed meals, composted waste, and biochar. Soil amendments also help improve water retention, drainage, and soil's PH level.

=== Reduced till ===
Reduced till is a practice employed to reduce soil disturbance, and thereby help maintain soil fertility. It involves minimal soil disturbance and avoids turning soil cultivation to promote soil porosity, water retention, and organic matter which is crucial for below ground biodiversity to thrive. Till farming, most commonly known as "tillage", is the process of aerating soil through mechanical agitation to help seeds germinate. This practice is most commonly used in industrial agriculture, and results in the destruction of soil structure thereby increasing greenhouse gas emissions.

=== Integrated crop-livestock systems ===
Integrated crop-livestock systems (ICLSs) combine crop production and livestock to create a self sustaining environment that is less reliant on fertilizers, industrial farming practices, and synthetic amendments. This is accomplished through practices like rotational grazing, which involves moving livestock between different crops to allow grazed areas to regenerate, minimize soil depletion, and maximize nutrient production by providing natural manure fertilization.

=== Targeted microbial inoculation ===
Targeted microbial inoculation involves the use of plant growth promotion microorganisms (PGPMs) to boost crop resilience against environmental stressors that have been heightened because of the effects of climate change. PGPMs foster microbial biodiversity in soil. This increases nutrient availability, reduces reliance on chemical fertilizers and pesticides, and strengthens soil structure. Targeted microbial inoculation has proved beneficial for decreasing greenhouse gas emissions, increasing crop yields, and becoming a strategy for sustainable farming.

== Measures of diversification ==
Agricultural diversification is measured in a number of ways throughout the world. For example, one such measure is the index of maximum proportion, which is "defined as the ratio (proportion) of the farm's primary activity to its total activities".

== Ecosystem and environmental outcomes ==
Diversification enhances multiple ecosystem services important to production and resilience. Outcomes include increases in above and below ground biodiversity, pollination, pest regulation, nutrient cycling, soil fertility, water regulation, and carbon sequestration, while overall crop yields are generally maintained at levels comparable to simplified systems. Some climate-related effects are heterogenous; for example, organic amendments in flooded systems can raise methane emissions while improving soil carbon stocks.

== Socioeconomic outcomes ==
Diversification can improve farm-level economic performance and income stability. Some practical examples of this are reports of an overall increase in economic performance of roughly 26% across rice systems, and a long-term second order meta-analysis that found large increases in financial profitability over multi-decade periods for diversified systems. In the years 2024 and 2025, 72% of English farm businesses reported at least one diversified activity. Agricultural diversification has become a strategy used to improve farm viability and support rural jobs, while also being able to protect soil fertility and productivity, ensuring a more sustainable way of farming than industrial agriculture. Small farms have been the greatest beneficiaries, as these tools provide them with entrepreneurial opportunities and market diversification.

== Food security ==
As global demand for food grows boundlessly, the issue of food insecurity becomes more pronounced. Food production must increase to meet worldwide demand, while still trying to be sustainable. Agricultural diversification has become a strategy employed to fulfill this task. Regional and household level studies indicate that diversification can contribute to food availability and dietary diversity. A continental analysis across 28,000 African households found that higher farming diversity was associated with greater food availability up to a threshold of 3 to 4 crops per hectare. The benefits of diversification, especially when it comes to food security, are more pronounced in small farms, helping independent farmers find production stability in times of stress, allowing them to have access to a myriad of nutrients coming from a variety of crops.

== Drivers of diversification ==
Diversification can be a response to both opportunities and threats.

=== Opportunities ===
- Changing consumer demand. As consumers in developing countries have become richer, food consumption patterns have changed noticeably. People have moved away from a diet based on staples to one with a greater content of animal products (meat, eggs, and dairy) and fruits and vegetables. In turn, more dynamic farmers are able to diversify to meet these needs. There is a possibility that this trend will be reversed in future given increasing consumer concern about the environmental impact of meat production.
- Changing demographics. Rapid urbanization in developing countries affects consumption patterns. Moreover, a smaller number of farmers, in percentage terms at least, has to supply a larger number of consumers. While this may not imply diversification it does require adaptation to new farming techniques to meet higher demand.
- Export potential. Developing country farmers have had considerable success by diversifying into crops that can meet export market demand. While concern about food miles, as well as the cost of complying with supermarket certification requirements such as for GlobalGAP may jeopardize this success in the long run, there remains much potential to diversify to meet export markets.
- Adding value. The pattern witnessed in the West, and now becoming widespread in developing countries, is for consumers to devote less and less time to food preparation. They increasingly require ready-prepared meals and labour-saving packaging, such as pre-cut salads. This provides the opportunity for farmers to diversify into value addition, particularly in countries where supermarkets play a major role in retailing.
- Changing marketing opportunities. The changing of government policies that control the way in which farmers can link to markets can open up new diversification possibilities. For example, in India, policy changes to remove the monopoly of state "regulated markets" to handle all transactions made it possible for farmers to establish direct contracts with buyers for new products.
- Improving nutrition. Diversifying from the monoculture of traditional staples can have important nutritional benefits through more diverse diets which lead to better nutrient intake and health.

=== Threats ===
- Urbanization. This is both an opportunity and a threat, in that the expansion of cities places pressure on land resources and puts up the value of the land. If farmers are to remain on the land they need to generate greater income from that land than they could by growing basic staples. This fact, and the proximity of markets, explains why farmers close to urban areas tend to diversify into high-value crops.
- Risk. Farmers face risk from bad weather and from fluctuating prices. Diversification is a logical response to both. For example, some crops are more drought-resistant than others, but may offer poorer economic returns. A diversified portfolio of products should ensure that farmers do not suffer complete ruin when the weather is bad. Similarly, diversification can manage price risk, on the assumption that not all products will suffer low prices at the same time. In fact, farmers often do the opposite of diversification by planting products that have a high price in one year, only to see the price collapse in the next, as explained by the cobweb theory.
- External threats. Farmers who are dependent on exports run the risk that conditions will change in their markets, not because of a change in consumer demand but because of policy changes. A classic example is the Caribbean banana industry, which collapsed as a result of the removal of quota protection on EU markets, necessitating diversification by the region's farmers.
- Domestic policy threats. Agricultural production is sometimes undertaken as a consequence of government subsidies, rather than because it is inherently profitable. The reduction or removal of those subsidies, whether direct or indirect, can have a major effect on farmers and provide a significant incentive for diversification or, in some cases, for returning to production of crops grown prior to the introduction of subsidies.
- Climate change. The type of crop that can be grown is affected by changes in temperatures and the length of the growing season. Climate change could also modify the availability of water for production. Farmers in several countries, including Canada, India, Kenya, Mozambique, and Sri Lanka have already initiated diversification as a response to climate change. Government policy in Kenya to promote crop diversification has included the removal of subsidies for some crops, encouraging land-use zoning and introducing differential land tax systems.

== Paths for diversification ==
In making decisions about diversification farmers need to consider whether income generated by new farm enterprises will be greater than the existing activities, with similar or less risk. While growing new crops or raising animals may be technically possible, these may not be suitable for many farmers in terms of their land, labour and capital resources. Moreover, markets for the products may be lacking. The United Nations Food and Agriculture Organization (FAO) has been one of the development organizations promoting diversification by small farmers and has produced booklets identifying beekeeping, mushroom farming, milk production, fish ponds and sheep and goats, among others, as diversification possibilities.

== Policy and incentives ==
Policy instruments and risk-management programs influence adoption of diversification. Government programs that implicitly favor uniform, high-input systems can reduce incentives to diversify, whereas targeted conservation payments, technical assistance for grazing and agroforestry, and insurance products that recognize farm diversification have been proposed to support broader uptake.

== See also ==
- Agricultural value chain
