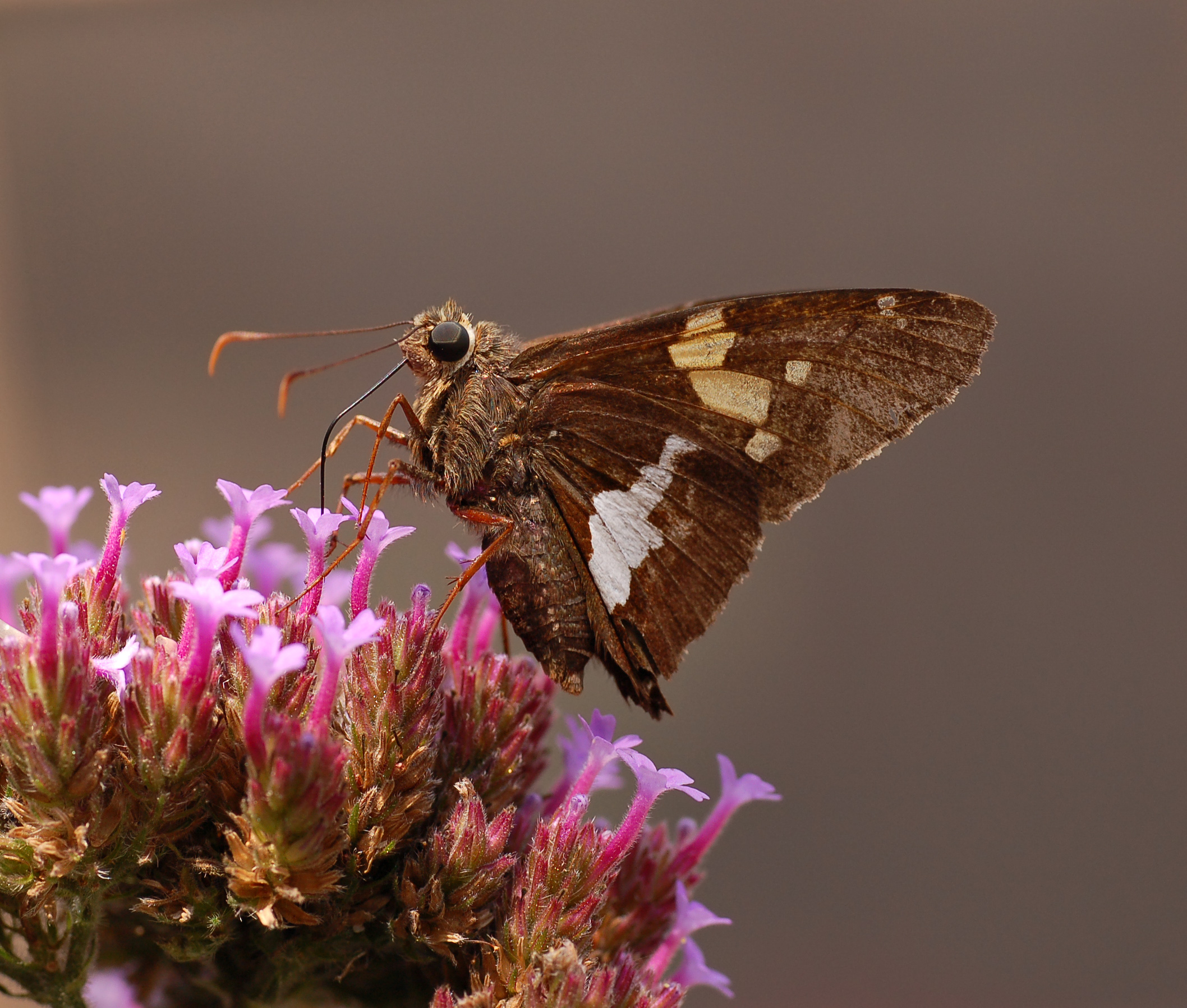
- Epargyreus clarus

Scientific classification
- Kingdom: Animalia
- Phylum: Arthropoda
- Class: Insecta
- Order: Lepidoptera
- Family: Hesperiidae
- Subtribe: Eudamina
- Genus: Epargyreus; Hübner, [1819]

Species
- Several, see text

Synonyms
- Eridamus Burmeister, 1875

= Epargyreus =

Genus of butterflies

Epargyreus is a genus of skipper butterflies in the subfamily Eudaminae. Several species in this genus are known as silverdrops. The species are found in the Nearctic and Neotropical realms.

== Taxonomy ==
=== Etymology ===
The genus name is derived from Greek argyros "silver", referring to the white spot on the ventral hindwing.

=== Species ===
The following species are recognised in the genus Epargyreus:

- Epargyreus antaeus (Hewitson, 1867) - Jamaica
- Epargyreus aspina Evans, 1952 - Mexico, Colombia
- Epargyreus barisses (Hewitson, 1874) - Brazil
  - E. barisses barisses (Hewitson, 1874) - Bolivia, Peru
  - E. barisses argentina Mabille, 1903 - Argentina
- Epargyreus brodkorbi Freeman, 1969 - Mexico
- Epargyreus clarus (Cramer, [1775]) – silver-spotted skipper – Canada to South America
  - E. clarus clarus (Cramer, [1775]) - southern Canada, U.S., Mexico
  - E. clarus huachuca Dixon, 1955 - Mexico, Arizona
  - E. clarus californicus MacNeill, 1975 - British Columbia to California, Mexico
  - E. clarus profugus Austin, 1998
- Epargyreus clavicornis (Herrich-Schäffer, 1869)
  - E. clavicornis clavicornis (Herrich-Schäffer, 1869) - Central America
  - E. clavicornis gaumeri Godman & Salvin, 1893 - Honduras
  - E. clavicornis tenda Evans, 1955 - Mexico, Colombia
- Epargyreus cruza Evans, 1952 - Mexico
- Epargyreus deleoni Freeman, 1977 - Mexico
- Epargyreus dicta Evans, 1952 - Bolivia
- Epargyreus enispe (Hewitson, 1867) - Colombia, Brazil
  - E. enispe enispe (Hewitson, 1874) - Brazil
  - E. enispe elta Evans, 1952 - Bolivia
- Epargyreus exadeus (Cramer, [1780]) – broken silverdrop – Guatemala, Honduras, Nicaragua, Panama, Colombia, Suriname, Brazil, Argentina, Trinidad
- Epargyreus nutra Evans, 1952 - Colombia
- Epargyreus orizaba Scudder, 1872 - Mexico, Guatemala
- Epargyreus pseudexadeus Westwood, 1852 - Brazil (Minas Gerais)
- Epargyreus socus (Hübner, [1825])
  - E. socus socus (Hübner, [1825])
  - E. socus chota Evans, 1952 - Trinidad
  - E. socus sinus Evans, 1952 - Brazil (Pará)
- Epargyreus spanna Evans, 1952 - Dominican Republic
- Epargyreus spina Evans, 1952
  - E. spina spina Evans, 1952 - Mexico, Colombia
  - E. spina verruga Evans, 1952 - Peru
- Epargyreus spinosa Evans, 1952 - Mexico
- Epargyreus spinta Evans, 1952 - Colombia
- Epargyreus tmolis (Burmeister, 1875) - Argentina, Paraguay
- Epargyreus windi Freeman, 1969 - Mexico
- Epargyreus zestos (Geyer, 1832) – zestos skipper – Antilles, Florida
  - E. zestos zestos (Geyer, 1832) Florida, Saint Thomas
  - E. zestos inaguarum Clench & Bjorndal, 1980 Bahamas
