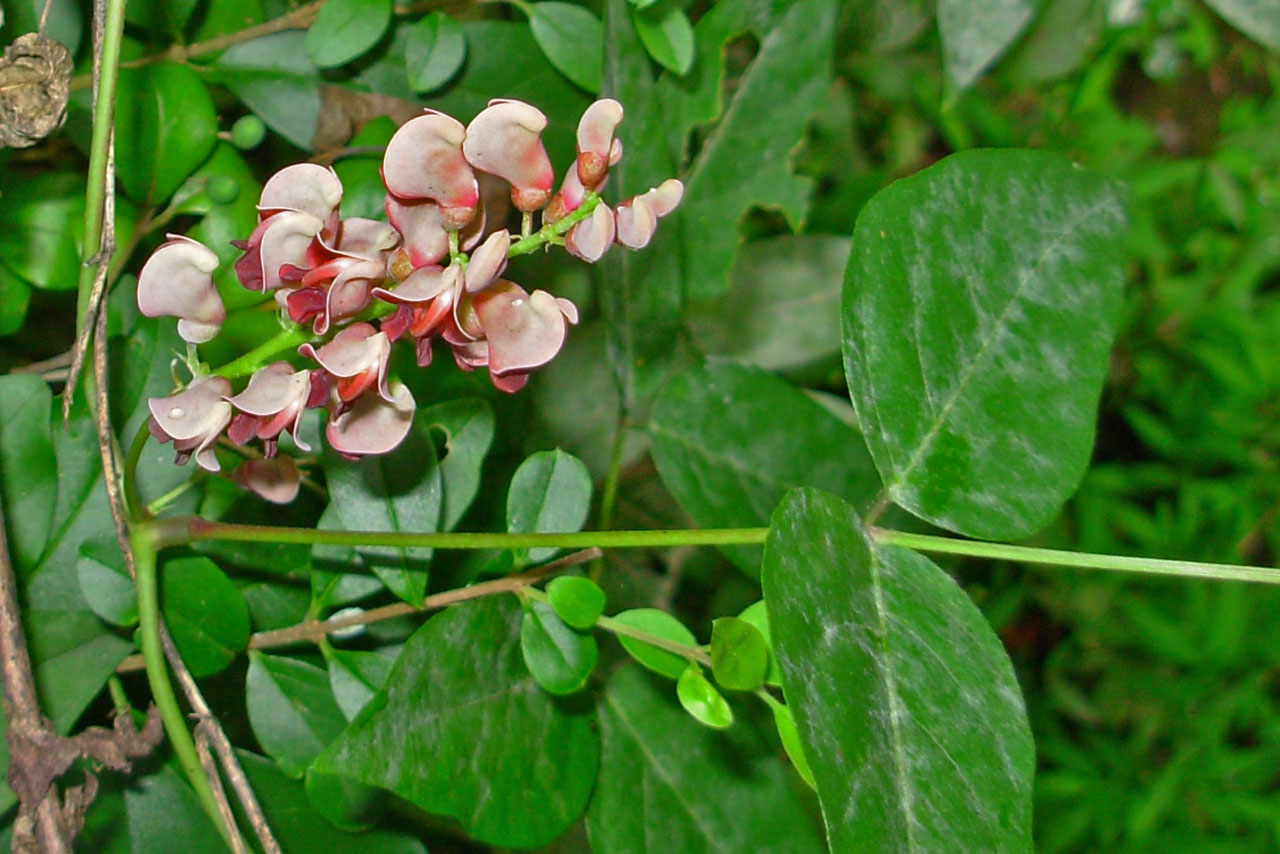
- Apios americana

Scientific classification
- Kingdom: Plantae
- Clade: Tracheophytes
- Clade: Angiosperms
- Clade: Eudicots
- Clade: Rosids
- Order: Fabales
- Family: Fabaceae
- Subfamily: Faboideae
- Tribe: Phaseoleae
- Genus: Apios; Fabr. (1759), nom. cons.

Species
- Apios americana Medik.; Apios carnea (Wall.) Benth. ex Baker; Apios chendezhaoana (Y.K.Yang, L.H.Liu & J.K.Wu) B.Pan bis, X.L.Yu & F.Zhang; Apios delavayi Franch.; Apios fortunei Maxim.; Apios marcantha Oliv.; Apios priceana B.L.Rob.

Synonyms
- Bradlea Adans. (1763), nom. superfl.; Cyrtotropis Wall. (1830); Gonancylis Raf. (1824), nom. nud.; Sinolegumenea Y.K.Yang, L.H.Liu & J.K.Wu (2004)

= Apios =

Genus of legumes

Apios is a genus of flowering plants in the family Fabaceae. It belongs to the subfamily Faboideae. It contains seven species of perennial climbing herbs or scandent shrubs. Several members of this genus are known to have edible, tuberous roots.

Apios species are native to eastern North America, from eastern Canada through the eastern and Central United States, and to eastern and southeastern Asia, from the Himalayas through Indochina, China, Korea, and Japan, from approximately 50° to 20° north latitude.

The name "Apios" comes from the Greek word for "pear" and may refer the pear shape of some tubers.

== Species ==
Seven species are accepted:

- Apios americana Medik. – eastern Canada and eastern and central United States
- Apios carnea (Wall.) Benth. ex Baker – Himalayas, Indochina, and China
- Apios chendezhaoana (Y.K.Yang, L.H.Liu & J.K.Wu) B.Pan bis, X.L.Yu & F.Zhang – southeastern China
- Apios delavayi Franch. – south-central China
  - Apios delavayi var. delavayi
  - Apios delavayi var. gracillima (Dunn) B.Pan bis
- Apios fortunei Maxim. – China, Korea, and Japan
- Apios marcantha Oliv. – eastern Tibet and south-central China
- Apios priceana B.L.Rob. – east-central United States
