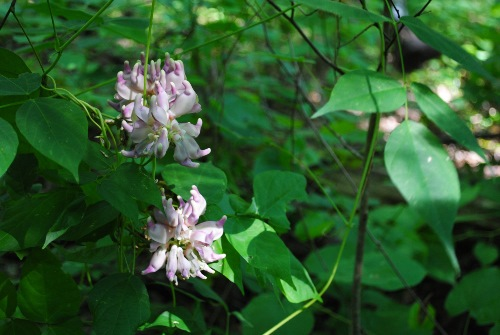

Conservation status
- Vulnerable (NatureServe)

- Threatened (ESA)

Scientific classification
- Kingdom: Plantae
- Clade: Tracheophytes
- Clade: Angiosperms
- Clade: Eudicots
- Clade: Rosids
- Order: Fabales
- Family: Fabaceae
- Subfamily: Faboideae
- Genus: Apios
- Species: A. priceana

Binomial name
- Apios priceana B.L.Rob.

= Apios priceana =

Species of legume

Price's potato-bean (Apios priceana) in bloom.

Apios priceana is a rare species of flowering plant in the legume family known by the common names Price's potato-bean, Price's groundnut, and traveler's delight. It is a climbing yellow-green vine growing from a stout, potato-like tuber. The plant is native to the Southeastern United States.

== Description ==
The vines may be up to 3 to 5 meters (10 to 16 1/2 feet) long. It has a large underground tuber, distinguishing it from other Apios species. The leaves are alternately arranged on the stem, about 20–30 centimetres (8–12 inches) long, and comprising seven leaflets. The fragrant pale pink or greenish-yellow pea-like flowers bloom in the summer. The fruit is a long slender pod about 10 to 15 cm (4 to 6 in) long.

== Distribution and habitat ==
Miss Sadie F. Price first found Apios priceana in Bowling Green, Kentucky, and it is categorized as an L48 N Native Status. The plant is native to the U.S. states of Alabama, Mississippi, Kentucky, and Tennessee, specifically the Tennessee Valley region of northern Alabama, and the Black Belt areas of central Alabama. As of 1898, there are four extant populations in Kentucky, Tennessee, and Mississippi, and three extant populations in Alabama. Apios priceana occurred in Southern Illinois in the past but its population there was destroyed. It is usually associated with openings in the forest canopy in mixed hardwood stands where ravine slopes grade into creek or stream bottoms, as well as in open rocky, wooded slopes, and floodplain edges. It is often associated with cane, chinquapin oak, basswood, and slippery elm. However some populations expand onto power lines or roads. The soil tends to be well-drained and very fertile, and Apios priceana is unable to tolerate a deeply shaded area.

== Ecology ==
Apios priceana is a climbing vine in the legume family, residing in the southeastern and central United States. It forms a long, spheroidal perodial tuber that enlarges each year. It has hard seeds and germinates after temperature or water fluctuations. It can reproduce both sexually and asexually. The seeds of Apios priceana require scarification - breaking or nicking the impermeable seed coat- and temperature fluctuations to germinate. The plant regenerates from its tuber. The pollinators of Apios priceana are honey bees, bumble bees, and the silver spotted skipper in Kentucky. Megachiladae and the hummingbird clearwing moth were found to also be pollinators in a study done in 2016, investigating the pollinators of Apios priceana using surveillance of the plant. Apios priceana also forms a symbiotic relationship with the soil that allows it to help in the fixation of nitrogen.

Apios priceana has a single tuber which grows bigger each year. This is different compared to the multiple tubers of Apios americana. Apios priceana is characterized by a standard petal with a thick, spongy, knot-like prolongation at its apex. It is a herbaceous vine which binds to other vegetation for support. It is adaptable to many types of soil and is low-maintenance, so it is a good source of food.

The threatened status of the species is primarily due to habitat destruction, but other impacts such as disease, predation, and historical tuber collection have also contributed.

== Threats ==
Apios priceana is listed as a Threatened Species by the U.S. Fish and Wildlife Service on January 5, 1990 and has remained threatened since. It is a S2 species in Alabama and a G3 species globally. Successional canopy closure, cattle grazing/trampling, right-of-way maintenance, and forestry activities are actively impacting the species' ability to survive and reproduce, ultimately causing a population decline. Additionally, Apios priceana has been impacted by trampling by hikers, overcrowding by shrubs, competition from introduced crown vetch, and succession.

== Conservation ==
With about 50 to 100 known occurrences, the plant is federally listed as a threatened species. Apios priceana is somewhat reliant on subtle habitat disturbance, but excessive modification is severely threatening to its existence. Some of these modifications include increasing canopy closure, cattle grazing and trampling, right-of-way maintenance and forestry activities. Price’s potato-bean is often found in open forests, along forest edges, and near creeks and rivers. Too much shade from large canopy trees can negatively affect the plant’s growth and ability to reproduce. In order to be removed from the endangered species list, at least 25 separate, self-sustaining populations must be established and maintained for 10 years. These populations must have stable numbers, show evidence of successful reproduction, and receive proper legal protection and management to ensure their continued survival. The protection of bee pollinators should also be valued to make sure that current populations of this plant continue reproduction sexually for future generations of the plant.

== Taxonomy ==
Apios priceana is a flowering plant of the family Fabaceae, subfamily Faboideae, tribe Phaseoleae, and order Fabales. The species was formally described for the first time in 1898 by American botanist Benjamin Lincoln Robinson in the Botanical Gazette. His description was based on specimens collected by botanist Sadie F. Price near Bowling Green, Kentucky. The genus name Apios comes from the Greek word for pear, referring to the pear-shaped tubers found in members of the genus. Additionally, the nicknames Price’s potato-bean and Price’s groundnut also come from the shape of the tuber. Apios priceana may also be referred to as traveler’s delight. In 1913, Nathaniel Lord Britton transferred the species to the genus Glycine as Glycine priceana. However, this transfer was seen as unfounded because the genus Apios had already been conserved against Glycine in 1906. A molecular phylogenetic study conducted in 2014 used nuclear and plastid DNA sequences to gain evidence for an evolutionary relationship between the two North American species. The study suggested that ancestral populations of Apios priceana and Apios americana could have migrated from Asia around the late Miocene or early Pliocene.

== Uses ==
The plant was probably used as a food source by Indigenous peoples of the Americas and early white settlers.

Apios priceana is classified by the National Academy of Sciences as an "underutilized, edible legume” with potential to be an alternative agricultural crop.

The large tubers that the plant grows from are edible and are known to have been used by Native Americans as nutrition. Agronomy of Apios priceana would increase agricultural land use for crop production because it produces large tubers in alkaline and wooded areas.

In 1986, a nutritional analysis of the edible tubers was done to evaluate the plant’s crop potential. In order to extract protein for humans out of it, the nonprotein nitrogen of the tubers can be extracted by alcohol, which improves the quality of its nutrition. Another benefit of Apios priceana is its germ plasm that scientists could use to crossbreed with other related species to create new hybrid crops.
