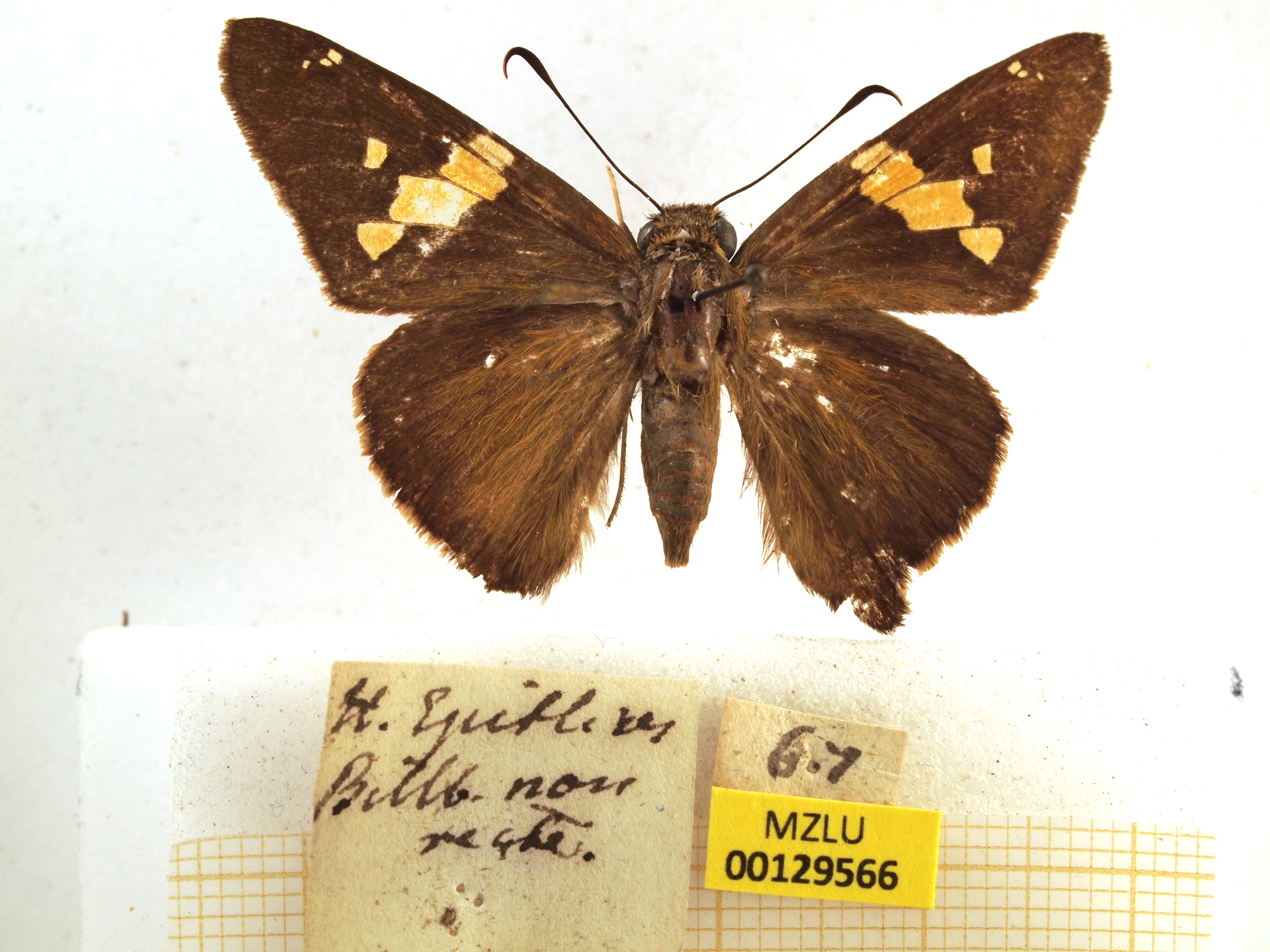

Scientific classification
- Kingdom: Animalia
- Phylum: Arthropoda
- Class: Insecta
- Order: Lepidoptera
- Family: Hesperiidae
- Genus: Epargyreus
- Species: E. zestos

Binomial name
- Epargyreus zestos (Geyer, 1832)

= Epargyreus zestos =

Species of butterfly

Epargyreus zestos, known generally as the zestos skipper or rusty skipper, is a species of dicot skipper in the family Hesperiidae. It is found in the Caribbean and North America.

A subspecies of Epargyreus zestos is E. zestos inaguarum.
