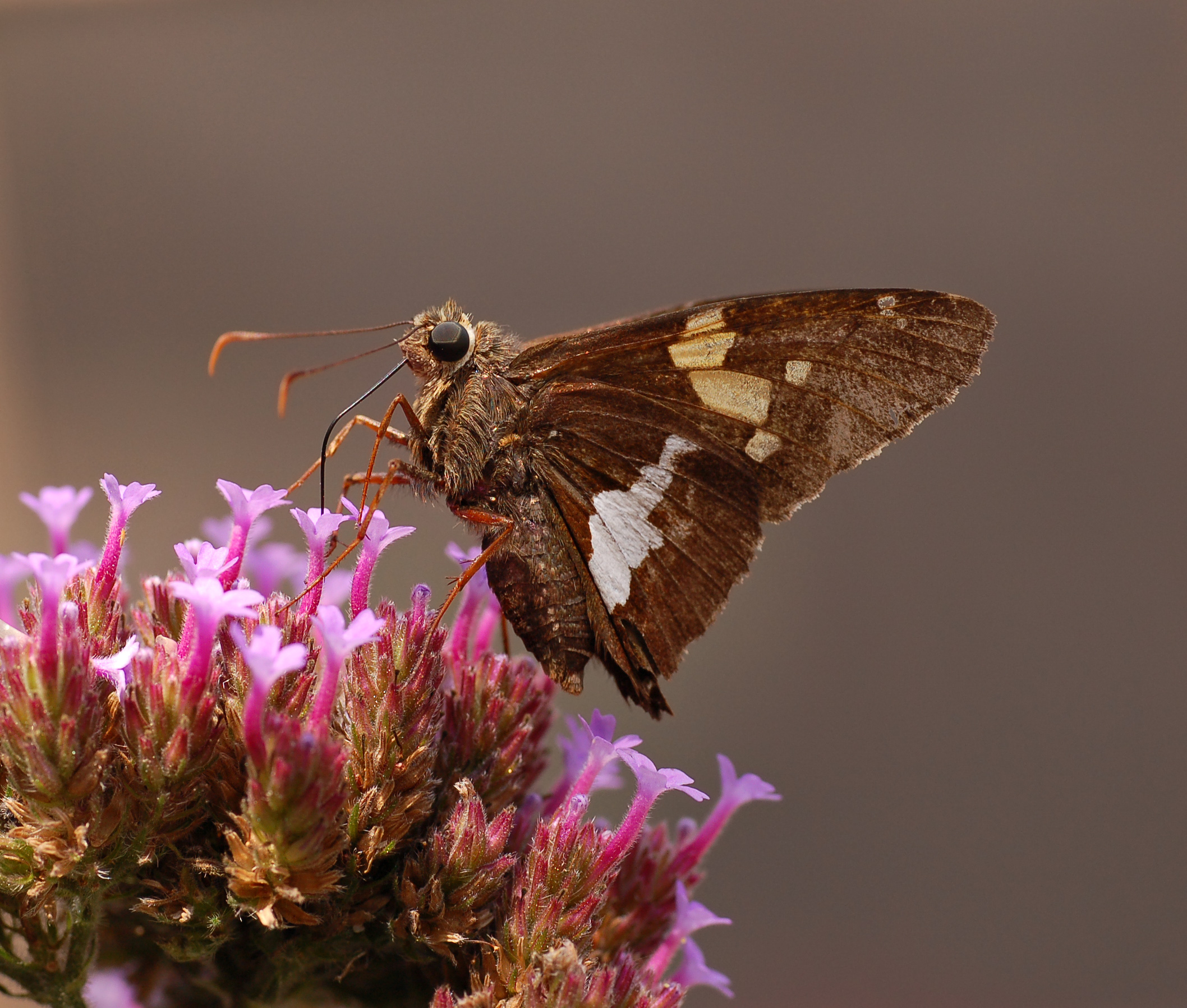

Conservation status
- Secure (NatureServe)

Scientific classification
- Kingdom: Animalia
- Phylum: Arthropoda
- Clade: Pancrustacea
- Class: Insecta
- Order: Lepidoptera
- Family: Hesperiidae
- Genus: Epargyreus
- Species: E. clarus

Binomial name
- Epargyreus clarus (Cramer, 1775)
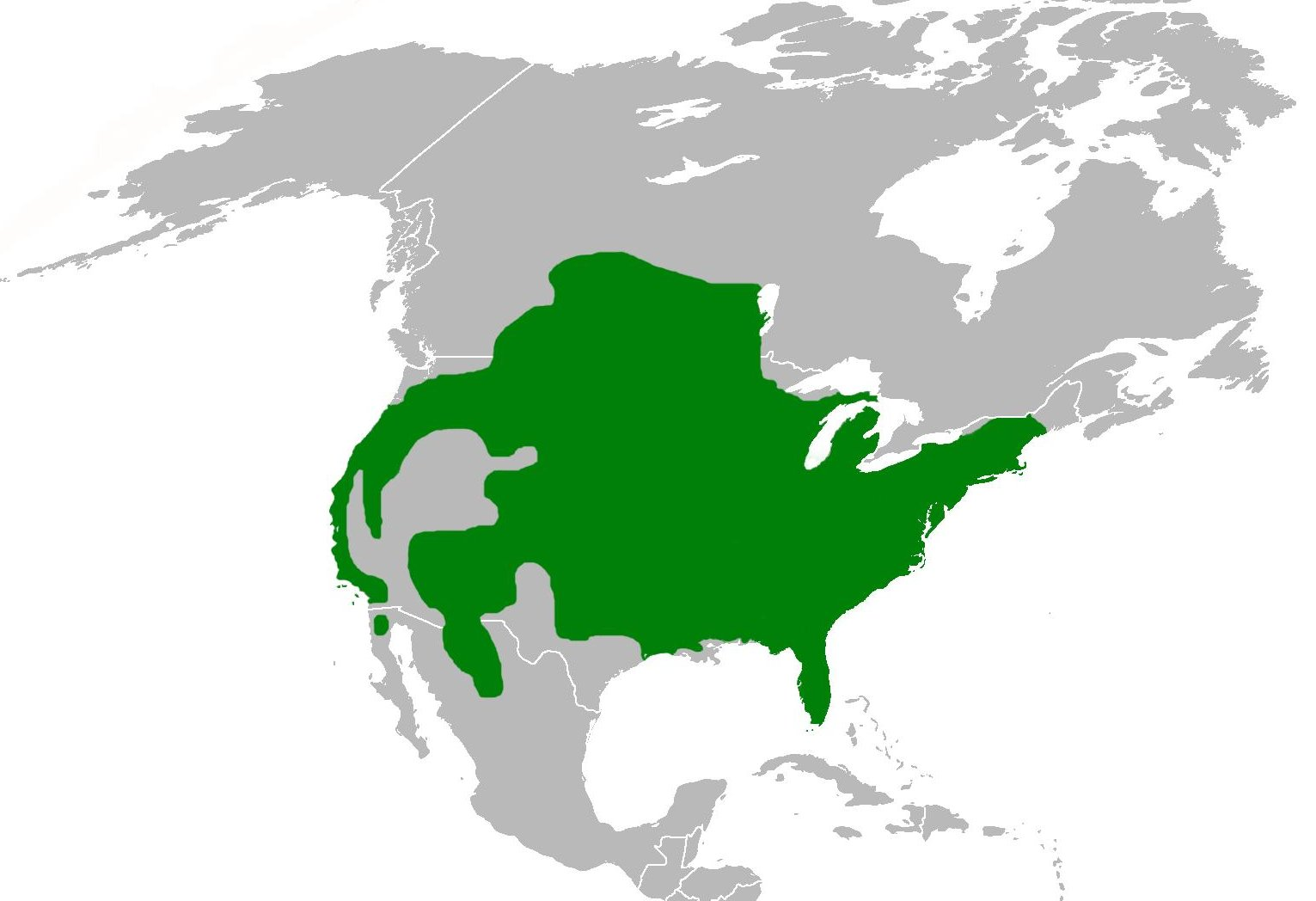

Synonyms
- Papilio tityrus Fabricius, 1775; Papilio clarus Cramer, [1775]; Epargyreus tityrus (Fabricius, 1775); Epargyreus titgrus Draudt, 1922 (Mis-spelling)

= Epargyreus clarus =

Silver-spotted skipper

Species of butterfly

Epargyreus clarus, the silver-spotted skipper, is a butterfly of the family Hesperiidae. It is claimed to be the most recognized skipper in North America. E. clarus occurs in fields, gardens, and at forest edges and ranges from southern Canada throughout most of the United States to northern Mexico, but is absent in the Great Basin and western Texas.

E. clarus larvae create and reside in unique shelters stuck together with silk, which do not protect them from predators. Natural predators of the species include paper wasp foragers, sphecid wasp and Crematogaster opuntiae ants. The species is also considered to be a perching species, meaning that adult males compete for territory to attract females. Although E. clarus is considered to be a pest of a few crop plants such as beans, its pest activity is not serious enough to warrant initiating major control measures.

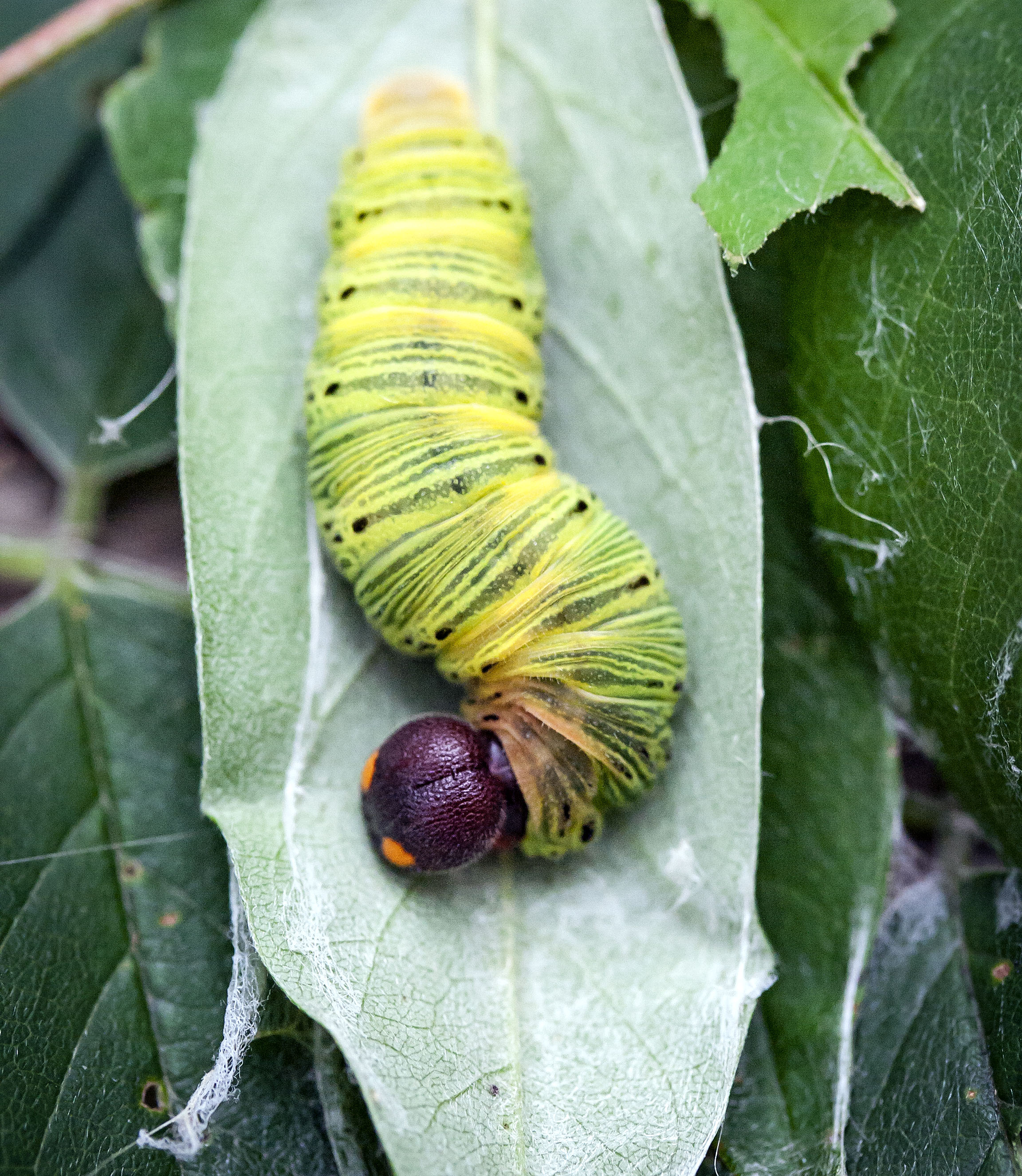
Silver-spotted skipper (Epargyreus clarus) caterpillar feeding on Wisteria

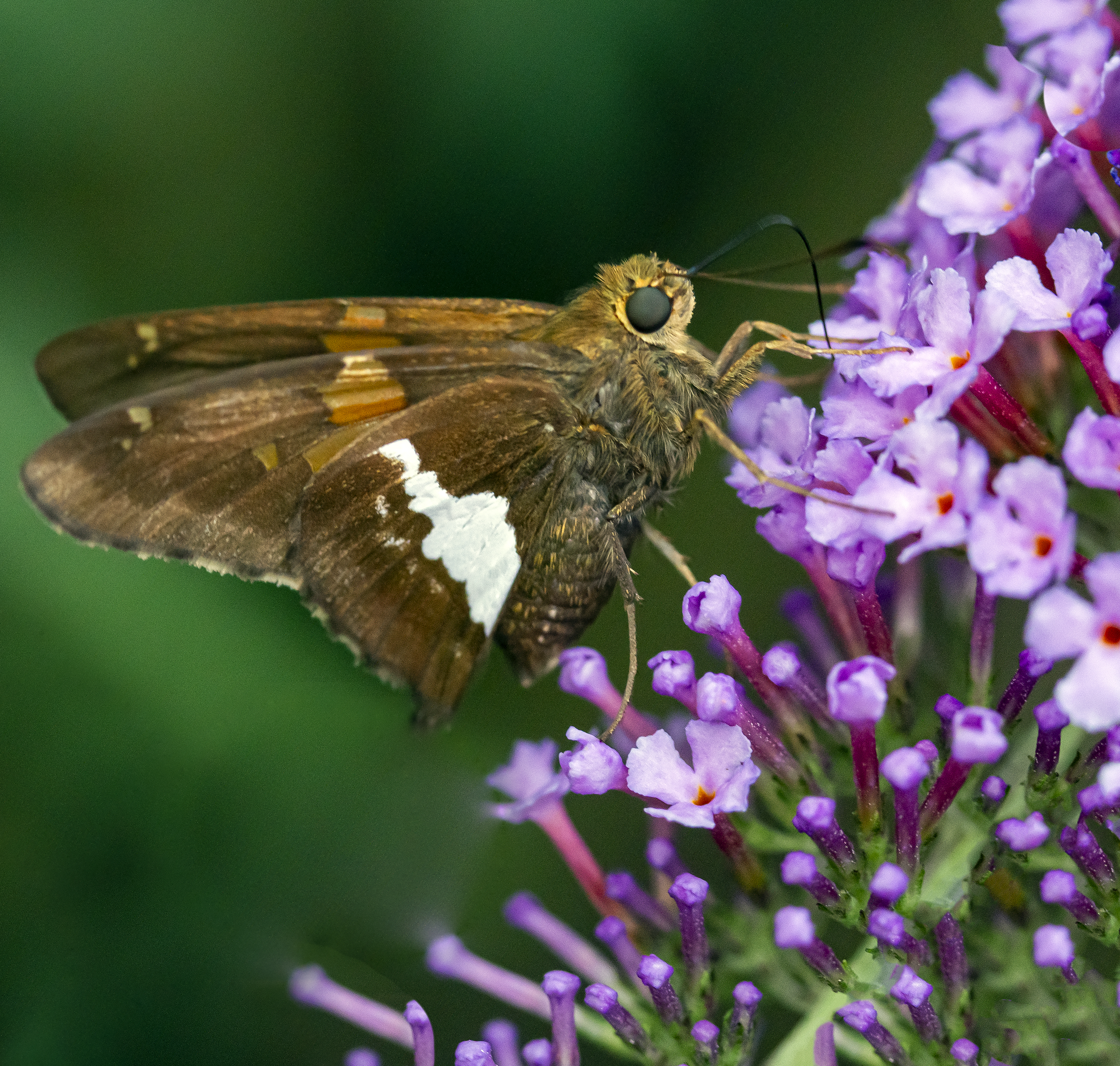
Silver-spotted skipper (Epargyreus clarus) adult feeding on Butterfly Bush

== Geographic range ==
Epargyreus clarus has a wide distribution throughout North America: it ranges from southern Canada throughout most of the United States to northern Mexico, but is absent from the Great Basin and western Texas.

== Habitat ==
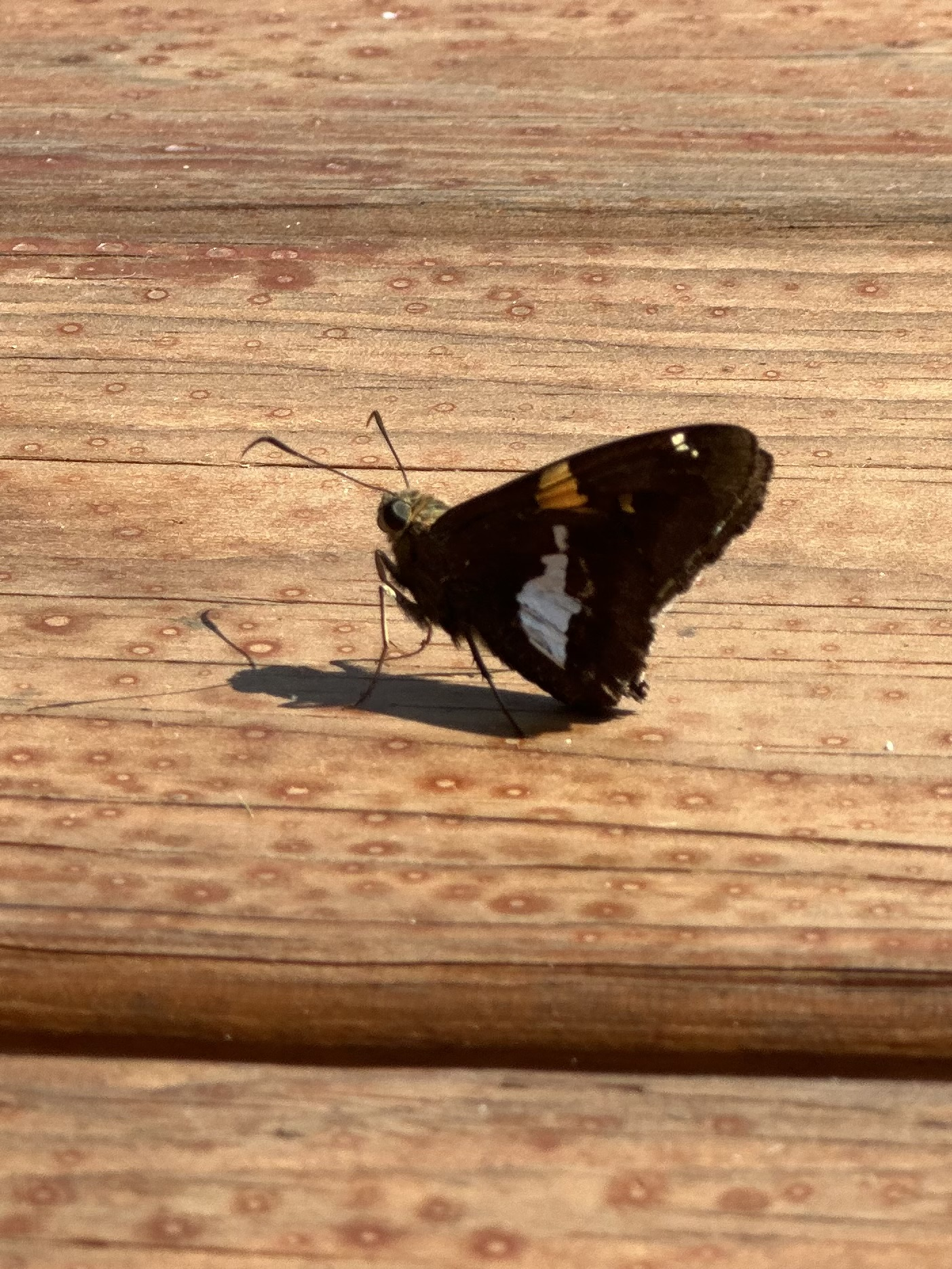
Silver-spotted skipper on a wooden floor at Morgan Falls Park in Sandy Springs, Georgia.

The silver-spotted skipper prefers open ranges where nectar plants are found, such as forest edges, swamps, brushy areas, and riparian habitats at lower elevations.

== Home range ==
At night, or on hot or cloudy days, Epargyreus clarus rests on the underside of a leaf. It hangs upside down, holding its wings together over its back so that its silver spot is exposed. E. clarus is often restricted by its habitat, preferring to fly in the shade.

== Food resources ==
=== Caterpillars ===
Epargyreus clarus caterpillars consume leaves of herbs, vines, shrubs, and trees in the pea family (Fabaceae) including false indigobush (Amorpha fruticosa), American hogpeanut (Amphicarpaea bracteata), groundnut (Apios americana), American wisteria (Wisteria frutescens), Atlantic pigeonwings or butterfly pea (Clitoria mariana), and the introduced Dixie ticktrefoil (Desmodium tortuosum), kudzu (Pueraria montana), black locust (Robinia pseudoacacia), Chinese wisteria (Wisteria sinensis) and an assortment of other legumes.

Innate host plant preferences confer greater performance on larvae, due to differences in leaf nutrient concentrations. However, preference may be influenced by a larva's rearing host species.

They live in meadows and swamps. Their average size is 2 inches (5 cm) long. Average life span is about 2 months. Their predators are wasps, ants, birds, frogs and spiders.

=== Adults ===
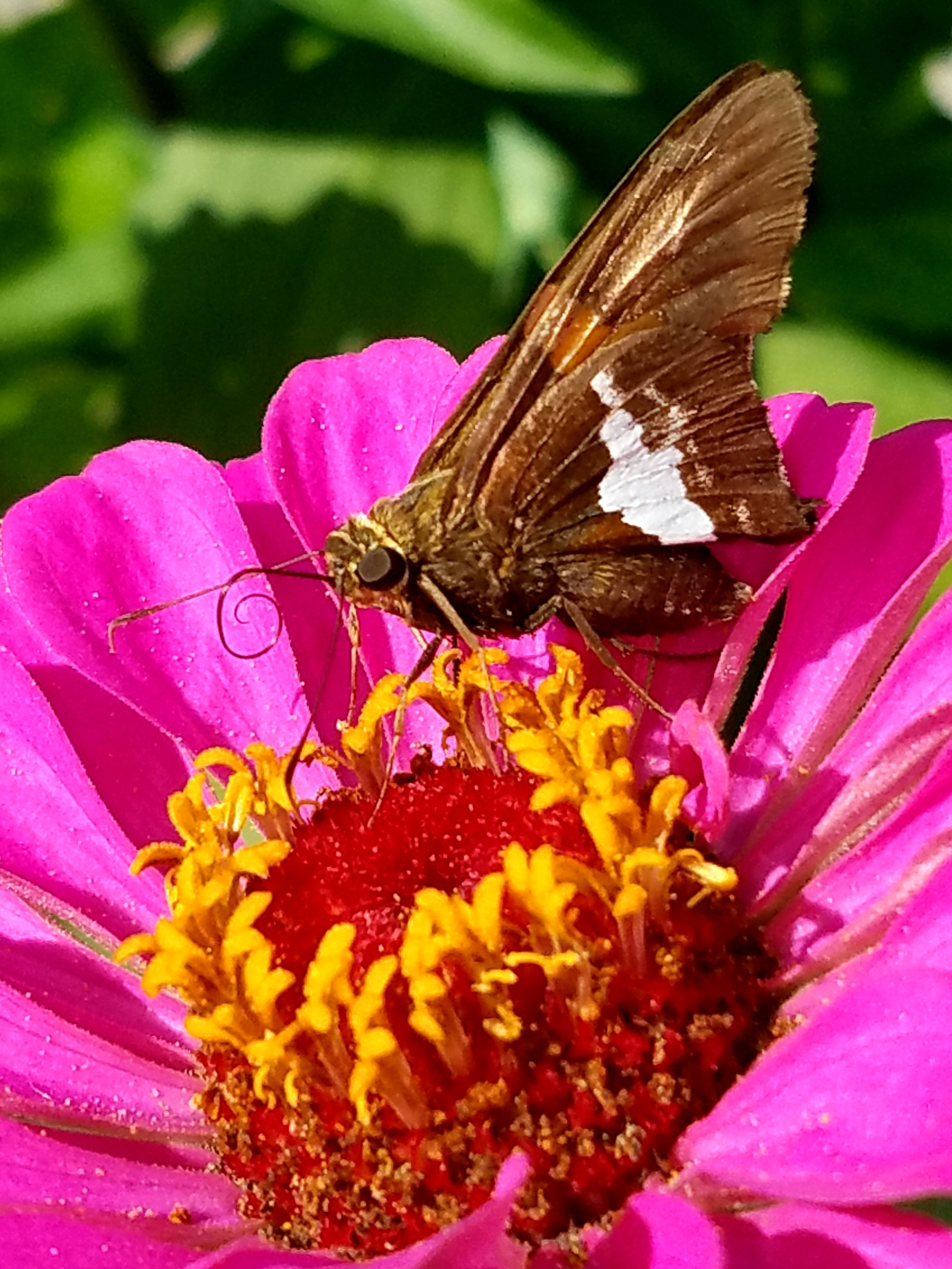
Silver-spotted Skipper unfurling its proboscis to feed on Zinnia

Adults use their long proboscis to feed on the nectar of a variety of flowers, mud, and animal feces. They almost never visit yellow flowers, favoring those that are blue, red, pink, purple, and sometimes white and cream. These include everlasting pea, common milkweed, red clover, buttonbush, blazing star, and thistles.

== Parental care ==
=== Oviposition ===
Females lay a single egg on or occasionally near host plants. They have been reported to oviposit on the least snoutbean (Rynchosia minima).

== Life cycle ==
=== Eggs ===
The eggs are green, with red coloration on top.

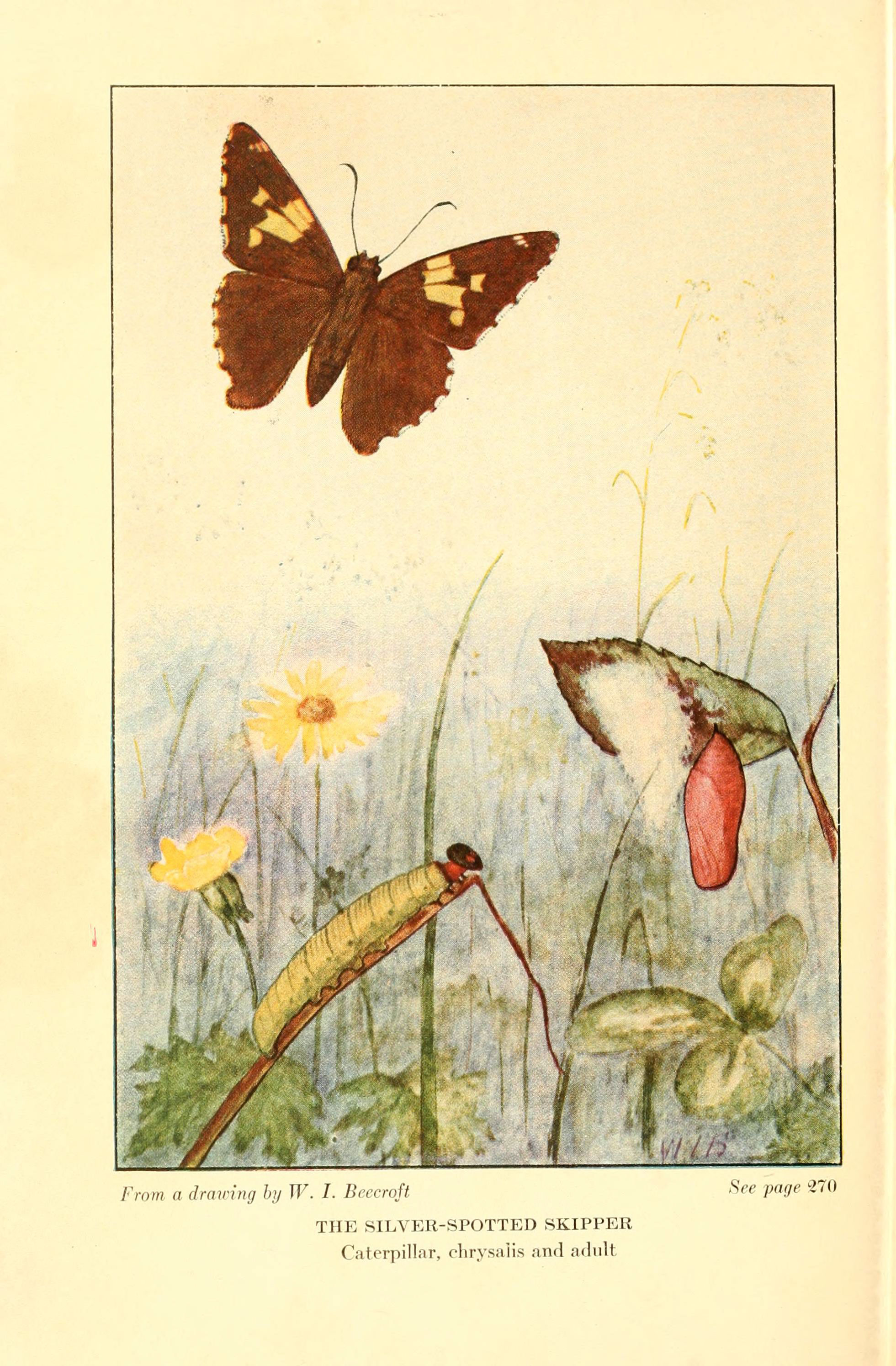
The three main life stages of Epargyreus clarus.

=== Caterpillar ===
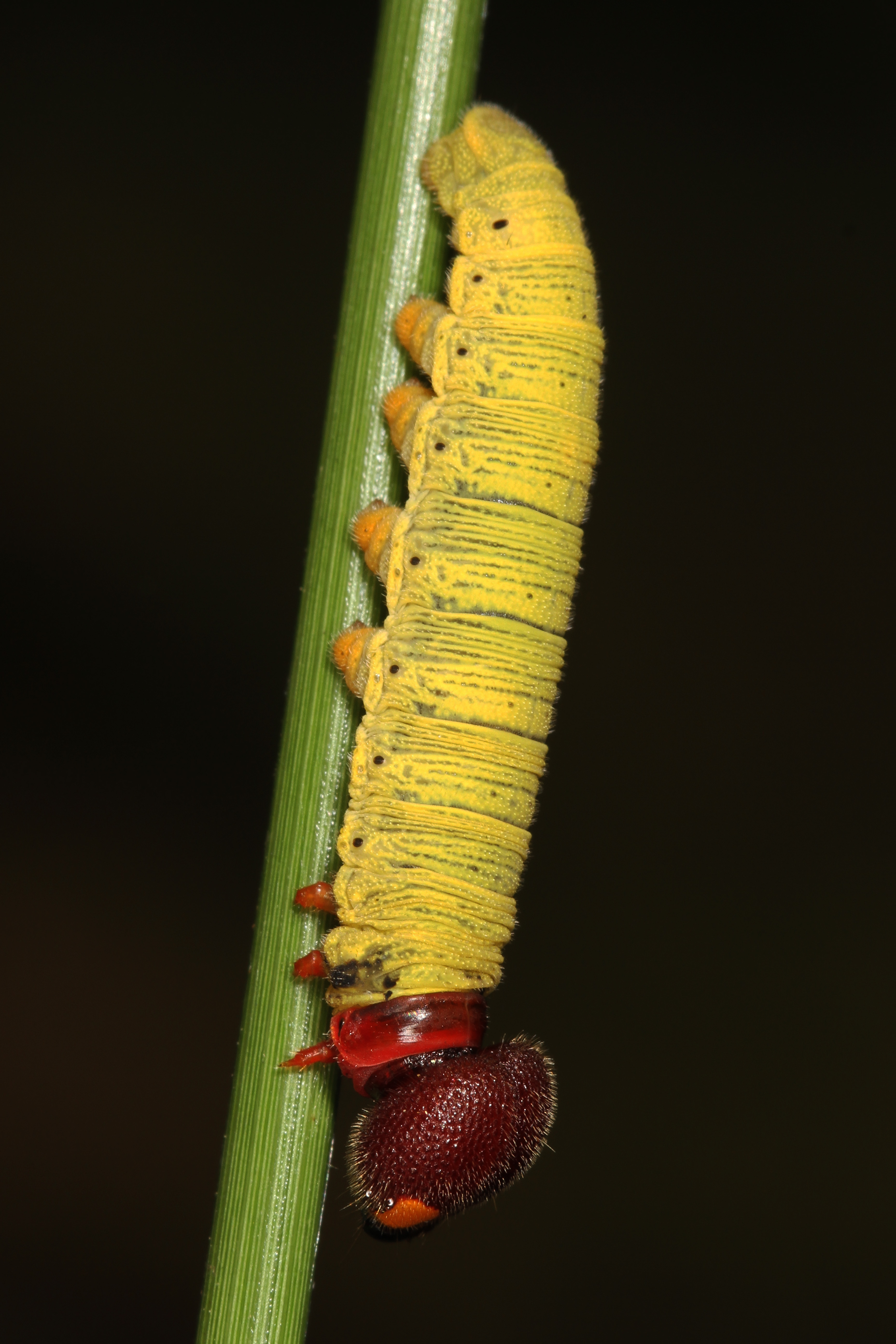
Larva

Larvae are yellow with transverse subdorsal black stripes. The first thoracic segment is black, has a brown prothoracic shield, and is significantly thinner than its adjacent organs – the head and second thoracic segment. The head is described as black or reddish brown with two large, prominent anterior orange spots, which mimic eyes. The three true legs and midabdominal false legs are all bright orange.

==== Shelter building ====
All larval instars of Epargyreus clarus build shelters on their host plant. They build about five shelters throughout larval growth and development in four distinct styles. These are constructed from instinct and are unique to larval size. The first, second, and third instars make a simple, invariant structure that requires two incisions in the leaf and silk to fold over the flap created. Shelters are typically built on the apical portion of the leaflet. One study of E. clarus larvae in the Washington D.C. area defined five steps of shelter building:

1. Site selection: Larvae traverse across the entire leaf, following major veins and swinging their heads to create a single silk trail.
2. Silk template: A thick, visible mat of silk outlines the intended incisions and ultimately becomes the ceiling of the leaf house. The larvae keep their posterior end on the template at all times.
3. First cut: The first cut follows the silk template on the perimeter nearest the leaf apex. The larvae often interrupt chewing cuts in order to deposit silk at the terminus. The first cut is completed in about 6 to 7 segments. At the end, the larva makes a U-turn motion so that its position relative to the leaf surface and template margins remains the same while facing the opposite direction.
4. Second cut and notch: The second cut follows the silk template on the edge closest to the base of the leaflet and is completed in about 2 to 4 segments. The first segment curves inwards, is made in a single effort and is about 75% the length of the first cut. The next segment is adjacent to the initial segment and continues past the length of the first cut. The juncture between the two segments creates a notch.
5. Folding and securing: The uncut area between the first and second incisions composes the hinge. The hinge length tends to correspond to larval body length. The larvae lay silk strands along this area, parallel to the cut termini. As the strands contract, the notch creates a pinch, and the leaf flap is pulled over the leaflet plane. The pinch then becomes the peak of the roof and the larva begins to make "guy-wires" that attach the edge of the flap to the leaflet surface.

Larvae take breaks of about 30 minutes between each cut and fold. It typically takes less than 2 1/2 hours to complete shelter construction. Larvae spend about 95% of their time resting on the ceiling of the shelter.

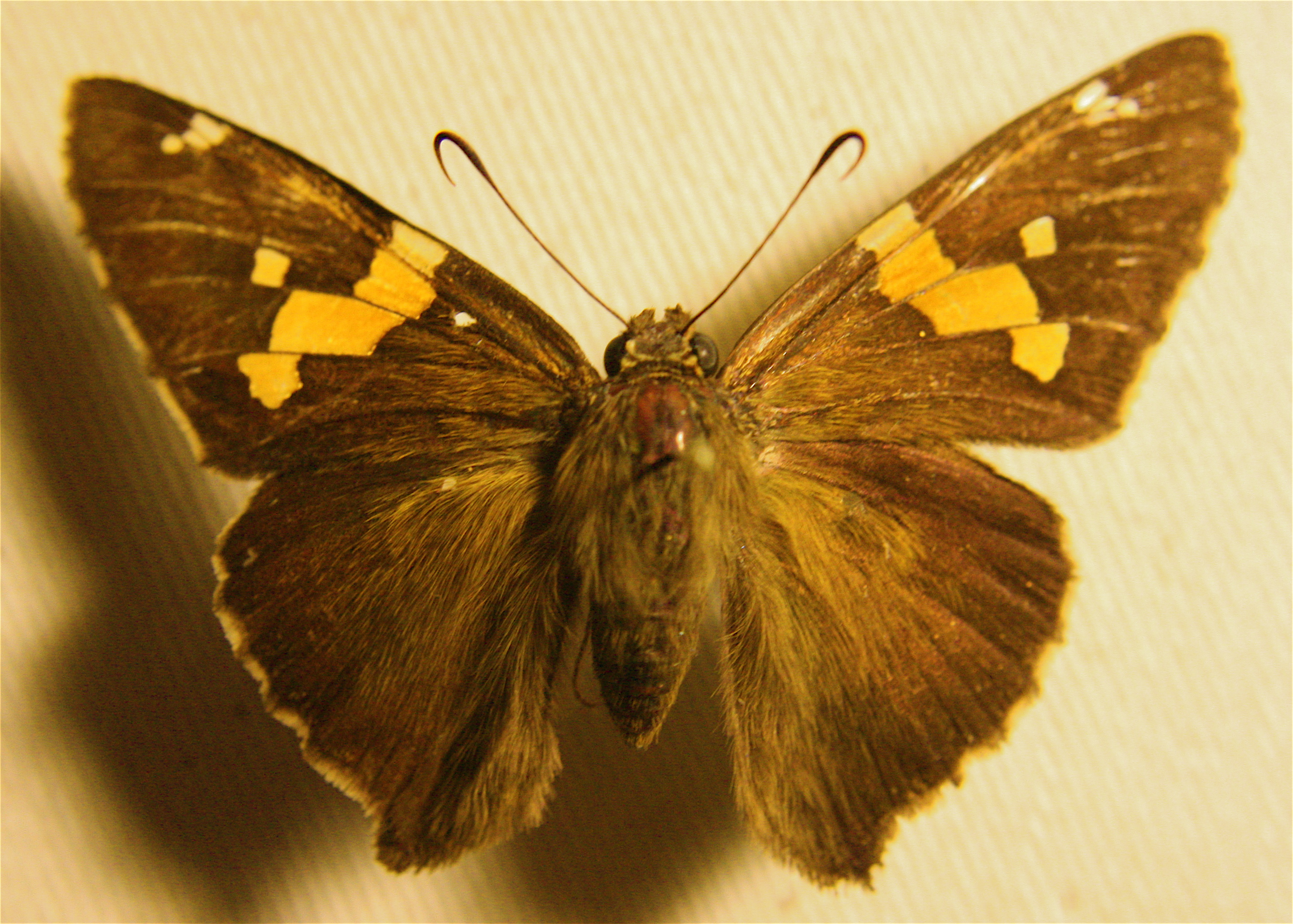
Adult

the silver-spotted skipper nectaring

First instar shelters are typically fastened by only about 2 to 4 "guy-wires". In addition, older caterpillars occasionally live in a nest made of multiple leaves connected by silk, especially when using host plants with smaller leaflets. For example, first, second, and third instars can make shelters with one Robinia leaflet, but the fourth and fifth instars have to use 2–4 or 5 leaflets.

=== Pupa ===
Larvae of Epargyreus clarus pupate throughout the winter. The pupa is dark brown with black and white marks. There are three or more overlapping generations of hibernating pupa in Florida – fewer in the northern regions.

=== Adult ===
The adult wingspan ranges from 1.75 to 2.625 inches (4.5 to 6.7 cm). Each forewing is triangular and dark brown with a large yellow-orange medial patch. Male forewings are more pointed than those of females. The hindwings are also dark brown, with a large silver patch on the discal third of the ventral side.

== Migration ==
Adults are diurnal and fly from early to midsummer. They have one brood per year in the North and West, two in the East, and three to four in the Deep South.

== Enemies ==
=== Predators ===
Wheel bug assassin bug vs. silver-spotted skipper caterpillar

Common predators of Epargyreus clarus include the paper wasp foragers Polistes fuscatus and Polistes dominula, as well as Crematogaster opuntiae ants. Studies have found that shelters protect larvae from these predators in lab settings. Shelters delayed or prevented Crematogaster opuntiae colonies from detecting the larvae. This is likely because of the ants' limited senses, in conjunction with the inhibitory structure of the shelter: they are able to detect a motionless caterpillar only within approximately one body length, and this is further obstructed by the single small opening into the shelter. While wasps in the laboratory setting did spend more time on areas of the leaf damaged by feeding or silk deposition, the larval shelter prevented visual detection and posed a physical barrier. However, shelters did not protect against these predators in the field. Wasps need spend only a few seconds on a leaflet to successfully identify and remove the larva from its shelter. This suggests that shelter identification and larval extraction is a learned ability, perhaps developed through visual or olfactory cues.

Other predators include the sphecid wasp Stictia carolina, which sometimes supplies its nests with silver-spotted skipper larvae. Additional predators also often are attracted to the chemical cues from frass, or insect excrement. Epargyreus clarus larvae use an anal comb to throw their frass up to 38 body lengths away from them. When disturbed, larvae regurgitate an unpleasant, greenish chemical in defense.

=== Parasites ===
E. clarus larvae are a natural host of Baculovirus. The advanced stages of this infection cause larvae to feed without resting. Later, they climb to higher and more exposed areas, where they are more conspicuous to predators. Predator attack leaves their infected remains to be absorbed by the surrounding vegetation, which will be consumed by new hosts.

== Mating ==
Instead of receiving ejaculate, a female receives a large spermatophore from a male for each copulation. Thus, the number of spermatophores a female contains roughly equates to the number of copulations. Generally, when there are more than two spermatophores present in a female, each one's placement and degree of erosion indicates its age relative to the other. Epargyreus clarus is particularly resistant to erosion. Once mated, females seem to reject males, at least for some time afterwards.

=== Male defense of places likely to attract females ===
Males perch on branches and tall weeds about 3.3 to 6.6 feet (1 to 2 m) above the ground, darting out when any insect passes in hopes of finding a receptive Epargyreus clarus female. When confronted by another conspecific, male movements are swift and acrobatic. This perching behavior is part of a common mate-location strategy in which males compete for places where females are more likely to occur. Females do not engage in this behavior, but may have to fly considerable distances to find mates, depending on the proximity of male territory to their larval development site. The places "defended" by males are roughly the size of a small room and are most likely chosen based on vegetation and topography.

== Physiology ==
=== Vision ===
Epargyreus clarus possesses compound eyes that lack pigment in the iris region. Each ommatidia, or single optical unit, has its own unique visual field that spans about 2°. The small visual field can be due to crystalline tracts in the eye that restrict the light to reach the retina only through this path.

== Interaction with plants ==
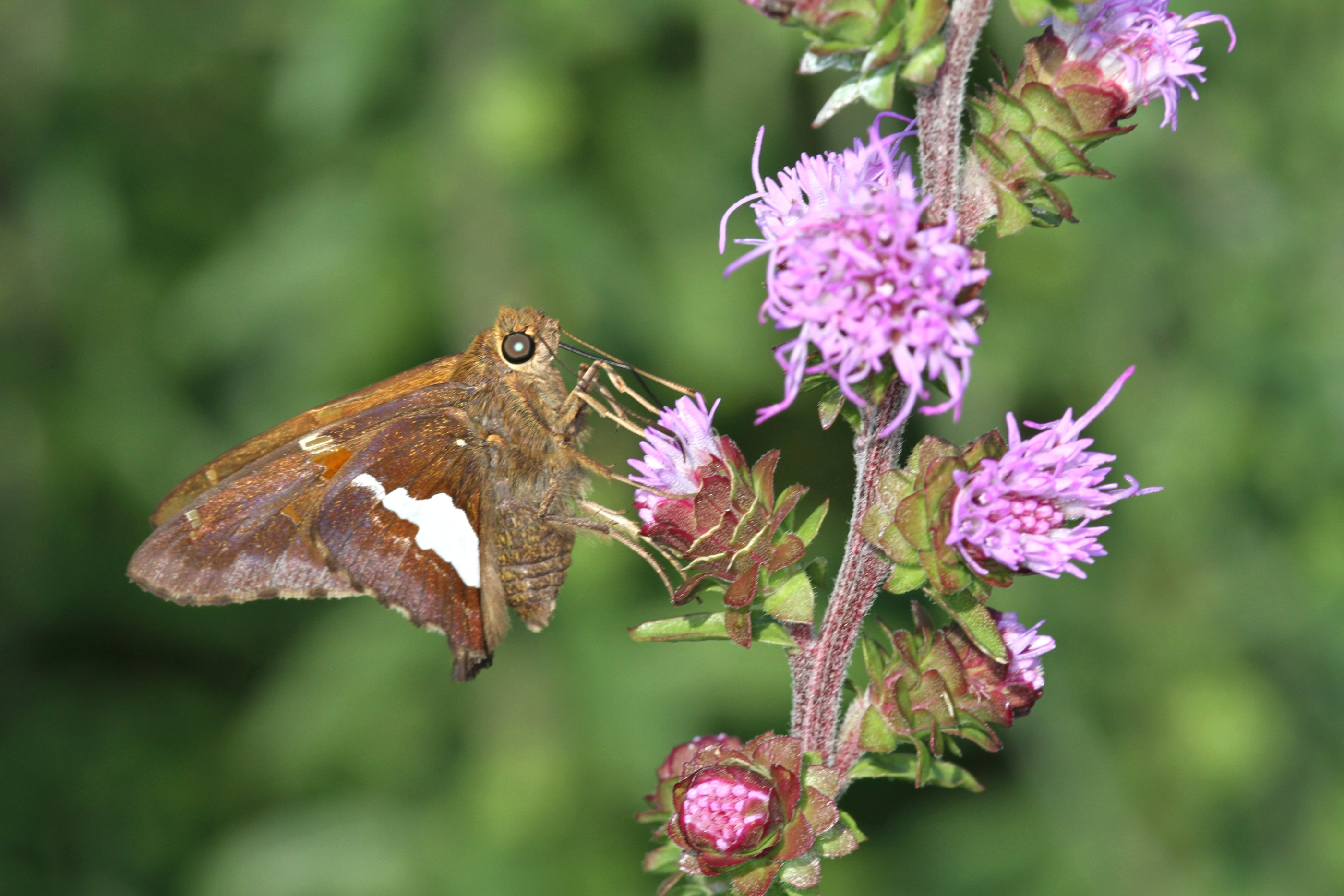
Silver-spotted skipper nectaring Liatris

Epargyreus clarus is known to be a nectar-thief species. An individual nectar thief is an animal that takes nectar from a flower but does not pollinate it while doing so. A species as a whole can be considered a thief species if it does not pollinate a species of flowers during more than 50% of its feedings. Research has found that while foraging on flowers, the butterfly tended to probe the innermost disk florets, which are the male organs, but not make contact with the outermost florets, which are the female organs.

== Pest of crop plants ==
Epargyreus clarus is known to feed on various crop plants such as soybean and kidney bean. However, no large-scale control measures have been taken, as the species' pest activity is not too detrimental.
