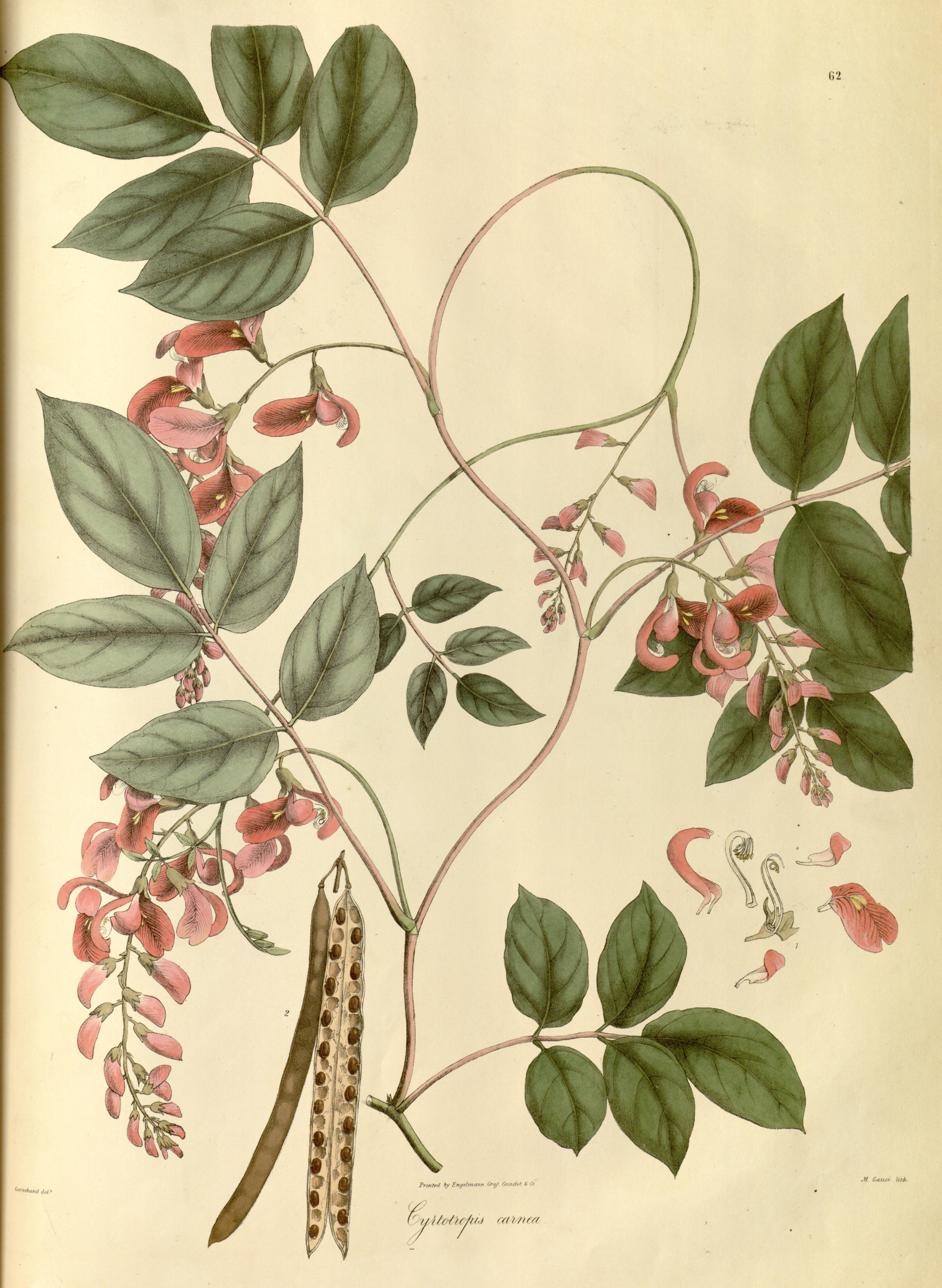

Scientific classification
- Kingdom: Plantae
- Clade: Tracheophytes
- Clade: Angiosperms
- Clade: Eudicots
- Clade: Rosids
- Order: Fabales
- Family: Fabaceae
- Subfamily: Faboideae
- Genus: Apios
- Species: A. carnea

Binomial name
- Apios carnea (Wall.) Bentham ex Baker

Synonyms
- Apios bodinieri H.Lév. Cyrtotropis carnea Wall. Pueraria stracheyi Baker

= Apios carnea =

Species of plant

Apios carnea is a vine in the Fabaceae family found in Asia in a narrow band from the Himalayas of Nepal across Bhutan, India, Bangladesh, Myanmar, China, Laos, and Vietnam. Petioles are 5–8 cm long; compound leave typically have 5 leaflets. The flowers are found in long peduncled flexuous secund racemes 15–23 cm long. The reddish, flesh-colored flowers are showy and have potential as an ornamental. Pods are 10–13 cm long and contain 12 to 16 seeds.
