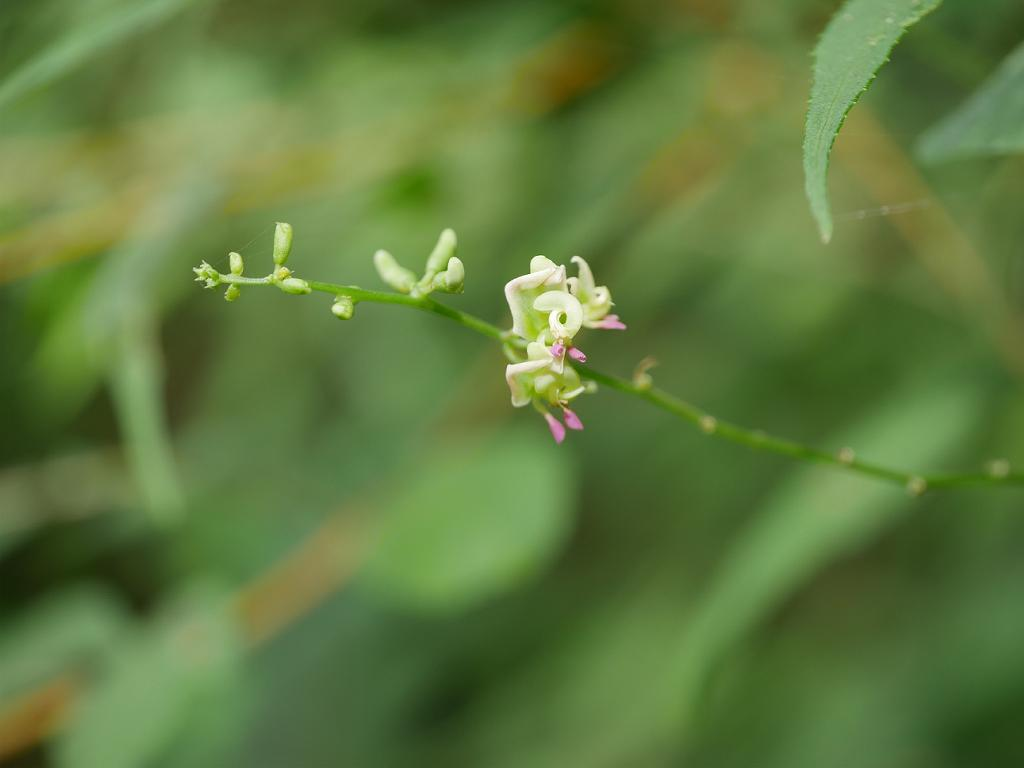

Scientific classification
- Kingdom: Plantae
- Clade: Tracheophytes
- Clade: Angiosperms
- Clade: Eudicots
- Clade: Rosids
- Order: Fabales
- Family: Fabaceae
- Subfamily: Faboideae
- Genus: Apios
- Species: A. fortunei

Binomial name
- Apios fortunei Maximowicz

= Apios fortunei =

Species of plant

Apios fortunei, commonly known as hodo, hodoimo, groundnut, or potatobean, is a tuber-forming member of the bean family.

The plant is a perennial climbing vine. The leaves are ovate or lanceolate, pinnate with 3–7 leaflets, and 3–7 centimetres (1–3 in) long. The flowers are whitish green, sometimes tinted light yellowish with a red-to-purple wing petal edge, or sulphurous green with rosy wing petals; they form pseudoracemes or terminal panicles, 6–26 centimetres (2 1/2–10 in) long. The fruit is a linear legume, 7–8 cm long and 5–6 millimetres (3/16–1/4 in) wide.

Chemically, the tubers contain starch as their predominant carbohydrate, along with smaller amounts of sucrose and glucose, with almost no fructose.

The species is native to Eastern China and Japan. In the wild, it is often found near brooks. It is one of three species in the genus known to produce edible tubers, although it has generally been considered an emergency food source as well as a medicinal plant. The flowers are showy and have ornamental potential.
