= Dietary diversity =

Variety of food consumption

Dietary diversity is the variety or the number of different food groups people eat over the time given. Many researchers might use the word ' dietary diversity' and ‘dietary variety’ interchangeably. However, some researchers differentiate the definition between the two terms, stating that dietary diversity is defined as the difference of food groups while dietary variety focuses on the actual food items people consume. Minimum dietary diversity describes dietary diversity and adequacy, which are two of the four principles of a healthy diet, together with balance and moderation.

Dietary diversity is related to nutrient intakes and is also an indicator of dietary quality. Moreover, dietary diversity associated with health outcomes such as being overweight or an increased mortality. Dietary diversity is influenced by various determinants such as physical and mental health, economic status, or food environment.

The concept that one should try to eat 30 different plants each week has been popularized after research by the American Gut Project found that such a diet increased the diversity of gut microflora.

== Lack of access to dietary diversity ==
Available minimum dietary diversity in women data represent almost 90 percent of women aged 15 to 49 years globally, with data gaps affecting some regions more than others.

In 2024 one-third of women and around two-thirds of children aged 6 to 23 months in the world consumed diets that were not sufficiently diverse, thereby putting them at risk of inadequate intake of essential vitamins and minerals required for good nutrition and health.

Globally, less than one-third of children aged 6 to 23 months (30.8%) achieved minimum dietary diversity, based on pooled data from 2018 to 2024, a prevalence level that has remained largely unchanged over the past decade (prevalence was 29.4% between 2011 and 2017). This means that more than two-thirds of young children worldwide did not consume sufficiently diverse diets, potentially limiting their intake of essential vitamins, minerals and other nutrients critical for healthy growth and development. In Africa, only one out of five children aged 6 to 23 months (20.5%) achieved minimum dietary diversity, compared to 34.9% of children in Asia in the same reporting period. Data scarcity, however, prevents the generation of reliable aggregated estimates for the other regions.

A large proportion of women, as well, lack minimally diverse diets, placing them at higher risk of not consuming sufficient essential micronutrients. Globally, only 62.7% of women aged 15 to 49 years achieved minimumdietary diversity between 2021 and 2025, meaning that about one in three did not. The lowest MDD-W prevalence was observed in Africa (43.0%), followed by Asia (65.0%) and Latin America and the Caribbean (77.5%), while the highest was recorded in Northern America and Europe (79.8%).

== Sources ==
This article incorporates text from a free content work. Licensed under CC BY 4.0 (license statement/permission). Text taken from The State of Food Security and Nutrition in the World 2026, Food and Agriculture Organization of the United Nations.

This article incorporates text from a free content work. Licensed under CC BY 4.0 (license statement/permission). Text taken from The State of Food Security and Nutrition in the World 2025, Food and Agriculture Organization of the United Nations.
