= Nada-ku =

Coordinates: 34°42′45″N 135°14′23″E

Nada-ku 灘区 なだく
- Ward
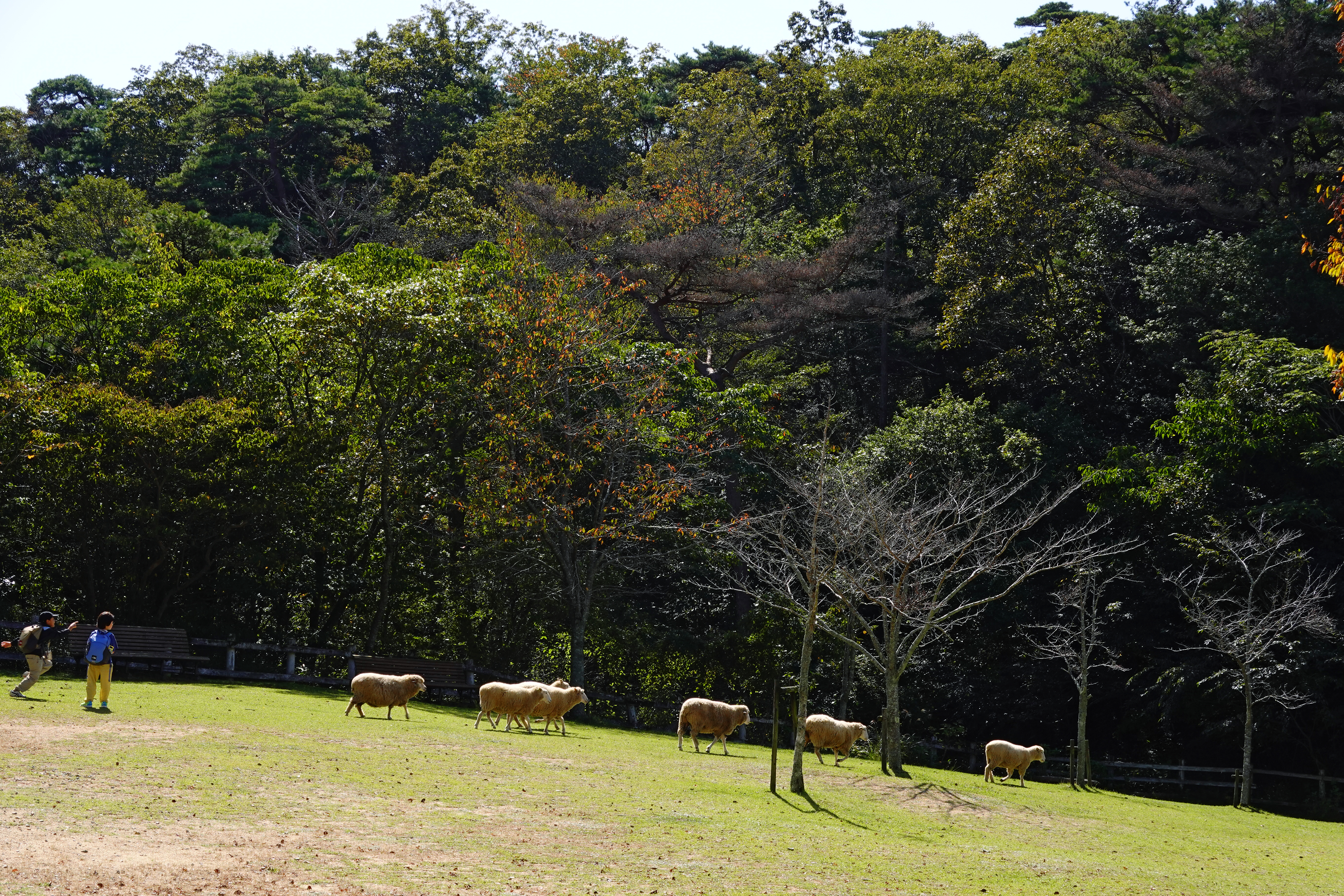
- Rokkosan Pasture (2025)

- Location of Nada-ku within Kobe
- Country: Japan
- Region: Kansai
- Prefecture: Hyōgo
- City: Kobe

Area
  - Total: 32.66 km^{2} (12.61 sq mi)

Population
  - Estimate (2024): 136,060

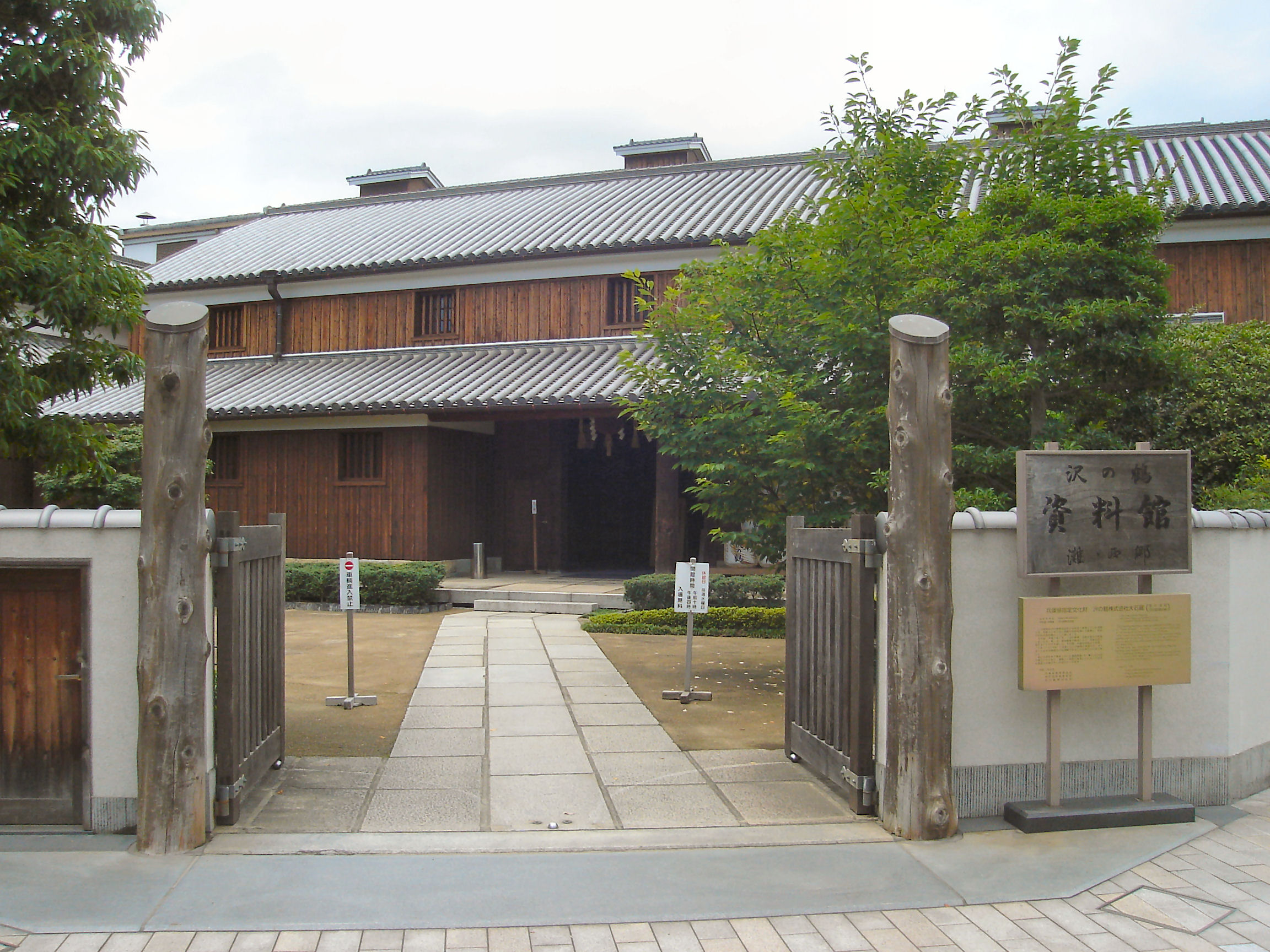
Sawanotsuru Sake Museum

Nada (灘区, Nada-ku; Japanese: [nadakɯ]) is one of nine wards of Kobe, Japan. It has an area of 31.4 km², and a population of 129,095 (2008). A leading national university, Kobe University, is located in this ward, as is the city's Oji Zoo.

The Tadao Ando-designed Hyogo Prefectural Museum of Art is a short walk south of the Nada JR station. Rokko High School is in Nada-ku.

== Sake production ==
Nada is a major sake producing region, and along with Fushimi produces 45% of all the sake in Japan.

A plenitude of water good for making sake and a location near Osaka (the hub of physical distribution) made it one of the most principal areas of making sake. It was one of the sake production areas called Nada-Gogō.

The taste of the Nada sake comes from 'Miyamizu' mineral-rich water, which was discovered during the Tenpō era (1830–1844) by Tazaemon Yamamura from the Uozaki-go district. Miyamizu is hard water high in calcium and potassium but low in iron, making it ideal for making rich, full-flavored sake.

Yamada Nishiki rice is grown in the Banshu eastern Kansai plains. It has larger, softer grains than regular table rice and is starchy, which makes it particularly suitable for sake making. Grains of Yamadanishiki rice have hard starch cores. This means that when they are soaked in Miyamizu water, they dissolve slowly but do not lose their shape. It is said that this characteristic is the reason why Yamadanishiki produces such uniquely flavored sake.

The most essential factors for making pure sake are good grain polishing ability and low temperatures. In the five sake-producing districts in Nada, water from the river that flows from Mount Rokkō into the sea is used to power rice-polishing water mills, thus producing highly polished grains of rice, which is not possible with manpower alone. Furthermore, the combination of the cold winds, known as 'Rokko oroshi', and the influence of the inland sea makes for ideal weather conditions for brewing sake in winter.

== Yamaguchi-gumi ==
The Yamaguchi-gumi, the largest Yakuza group in Japan, and one of the largest criminal organizations in the world, has its headquarters in Nada-ku.

== Education ==
Deutsche Schule Kobe used to be located in Nada-ku.
