= Sake Sommelier of the Year =

Sake Sommelier of the year
- Location: London World
- Country: United Kingdom
- Presented by: Sake Sommelier Association
- First award: 2013
- Website: http://www.sakesommelieroftheyear.com/

Sake Sommelier of the Year is an annual competition jointly organised by the Sake Sommelier Association. Started in London in 2013, the competition is the first its kind to be held outside Japan. The Sake Sommelier of the Year is a global event, and it was successfully held in Kuala Lumpur, Malaysia in 2019. The competition aims to find the most skilful Sake Sommeliers bringing them to the attention of their customers and raising the profile of their establishments.

More than 50 sommeliers from Europe, Asia and the Middle East entered the first competition in 2013.

In 2015, two new titles were introduced to encourage and reward contribution to the world of sake: Young Sake Ambassador and Sake Ambassador.

== Judging Process ==
The Sake Sommelier of the Year is open to any professionals involved in the service of sake.

After registering, applicants are sent a first-round questionnaire. From these, three finalist are chosen to compete in the live competition where they will be judged on knowledge, blind tasting, sake matching, and practical skill.

An enormous amount of learning and confidence-building takes place by taking part in the competition.

== The Sake Sommelier of the Year judging panels ==
The competition's judging panel represent a global mix of the most experienced, innovative, respected and awarded faces in the industry including founders of Sake Sommelier Association

== Overall Winners 2013 - 2019 ==
The Sake Sommelier of the Year is held annually and is sponsored by one of the world's oldest family-owned sake companies Gekkeikan.

The first competition was held on 11 November 2013 at the Westbury Hotel in London, and was won by UAE Sommelier Rajan Rengasamy, wine supplier Spinneys.

In 2014, the Sake Sommelier of the Year was held on 24 November at the Westbury Hotel in London for the second time and was won by Noel Pusch of Zuma Abu Dhabi.

In 2015, the competition was held on 23 November at the Millennium Hotel, Knightsbridge London and was won by Miguel A. Hernández from Valencia, Spain.

In 2016, the competition was held on 21 November at the Millennium Hotel, Knightsbridge London and was won by Venkadesh Thanga Mariappan of the Bonnington Jumeirah Lakes Tower Hotel, UAE.

In 2018, the competition was held on 20 May at the Millennium Hotel, Knightsbridge London and was won by Joshua Kalinan Sinnathamby from Singapore Airlines, Singapore.

In 2019, the competition was held on 25 November at the Sake Place, Kuala Lumpur Malaysia and was won by Brett Goss Associate at Sake Central, Hong Kong

== Young Sake Ambassador ==
The Young Sake Ambassador is an annual award given to someone aged 18–30 who has had little to no previous experience with sake, but who shows a great interest, enthusiasm, and desire to contribute to the world of sake. The Young Sake Ambassador is motivated to expand the knowledge and appreciation of sake either in their own community or help it grow worldwide.

The aim of this award is to bring a fresh mind-set into the sake industry worldwide. The selected Young Sake Ambassador of the Year will be expected to spend a year contributing to the promotion of sake with the Sake Sommelier Association's support.

== Sake Ambassador ==
Awarded every two years, the Sake Ambassador is bestowed upon someone for their outstanding dedication to the world of sake. The individual will have been working for sake diplomacy, contributing to the understanding and appreciation of sake throughout their country.

== See also ==
- London Sake Challenge
- Sake sommelier association
