= Nada-Gogō =

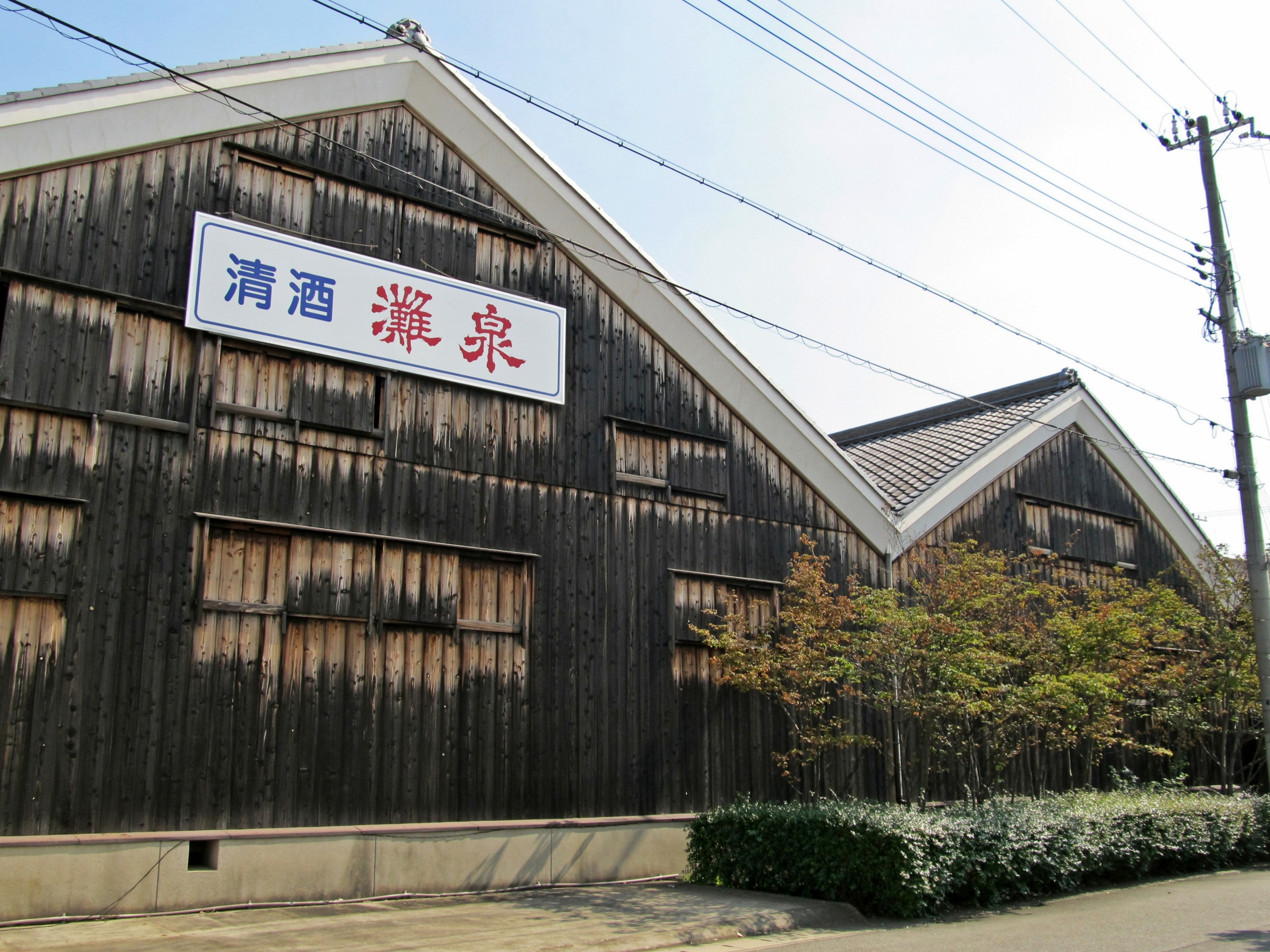
Brewery of Izumi Yūnosuke Shōten, the only wooden building brewery in Nada-Gogō (Mikage-gō)

Nada-Gogō (灘五郷, nada-gogō, "The Five Villages of Nada") are five area-based groupings of sake breweries in the cities of Kobe and Nishinomiya, Hyōgo Prefecture, Japan. It is the largest sake producing region in Japan, with breweries in the area accounting for just over one quarter of the sake production in the entire country.

== History ==
Records show that sake production first started in Nada nearly 700 years ago, in 1330.

However, the beginning of Nada sake's rise to popularity is often said to be when Bunzaemon Zakoya moved to the area from Itami City and started a brewery there during the Kan'ei period. The rise of Nada's sake coincided with the rise of the Tokugawa shogunate, which had barrels of sake shipped to Edo aboard ships.

Many breweries in the region were heavily damaged in the Great Hanshin earthquake in 1995, but most have recovered and continue to produce sake.

== The Five Villages ==
Nada's sake breweries are divided into five gō (郷, gō, villages). These are:

- Nishi-gō (西郷): Nada-ku, Kobe
- Mikage-gō (御影郷): Higashinada-ku, Kobe
- Uozaki-gō (魚崎郷): Higashinada-ku, Kobe
- Nishinomiya-gō (西宮郷): Nishinomiya
- Imazu-gō (今津郷): Nishinomiya

== Characteristics of Nada sake ==
Nada's sake has four distinct characteristics that make it unique from sake produced in other regions.

- Yamada Nishiki rice: The most famous sake rice in Japan, it is well-suited for growing sake due to its dense white core, low protein content, and consistent size and texture.
- Miyamizu water: A hard water that flows off of Mount Rokkō and results in strong, thick sake.
- Tanba Tōji: Tamba has a long tradition of sake production, and many of the brewmasters from the area have moved to Nada.
- Rokkō oroshi: Cold winds blowing down from Mt. Rokkō are used as a natural coolant to slow the fermentation process.
