= Sake Sommelier Association =

Global non-profit organization

- Association Logo
- Founded: 2000
- Type: Educational organisation
- Purpose: Understanding, education and appreciation of Japanese sake
- Location: London, United Kingdom
- Services: Sake education
- Website: www.sakesommelierassociation.com

The Sake Sommelier Association (SSA) is a global partnership of talented sake educators providing and accrediting sake courses and working to benefit the world of sake.

Created in 2000 by sommelier Xavier Chapelou and sake expert Kumiko Ohta, the Sake Sommelier Association is the first organisation based outside of Japan that is solely committed to sake education and promotion worldwide. Based in London, the association is also the first organisation in the United Kingdom to offer sake education outside Japan.

Created by sommelier Xavier Chapelou and sake expert Kumiko Ohta in 2000 in London, it is the first organisation in the United Kingdom to offer sake education outside Japan.

== Education ==
The Sake Sommelier Association operates from the London-based Sake Sommelier Academy and certifies the professional courses included in the programme of the Sake Sommelier Academy and their franchises worldwide.

The sake education courses offered are provided worldwide in over 30 countries, including Italy, Austria, Singapore, Hong Kong, China, Norway, New Zealand and USA.

=== Certification ===
The association offers several formal certifications. The titles granted to holders of certain certifications are as follows:

- Sake Sommelier UK00003532536
- Introductory Sake Professional UK00003883458
- Certified Sake Sommelier UK00003261186
- Advanced Sake Sommelier UK00002568202
- Master Sake Sommelier UK00003016255
- Master of Sake UK00003129840

== Sake Challenge ==
The Sake Challenge, established in 2012 by the Sake Sommelier Association, is a global series of sake competitions. Products submitted from breweries all over Japan are evaluated by Sake Sommeliers from around the world and judged by taste, quality, labelling and packaging. The first Sake Challenge (London Sake Challenge) took place on 20 August 2012 at Harrods during the 2012 London Olympic Games and was the first competition dedicated only to sake in Europe. In 2020, the Sake Sommelier Association hosted the first-ever virtual London Sake Challenge. Sake Challenges are held worldwide, including the Milano Sake Challenge, Bordeaux Sake Challenge, Tokyo Sake Challenge and Bangkok Sake Challenge.

== Japan life ==
The JAPAN LIFE event takes place following a Sake Challenge. The general public is welcome to partake in sake-themed events; guests sample a host of premium, sake and revel in many other fascinating aspects of Japanese culture.

== Sake Sommelier of the Year ==
Sake Sommelier of the Year is an annual competition jointly organised by the Sake Sommelier Association. Started in London in 2013, the competition is the first of its kind to be held outside Japan. The Sake Sommelier of the Year is a global event, and it was successfully held in Kuala Lumpur, Malaysia in 2019. The competition aims to find the most skilful Sake Sommeliers bringing them to the attention of their customers and raising the profile of their establishments. More than 50 sommeliers from Europe, Asia and the Middle East entered the first competition in 2013. In 2015, two new titles were introduced to encourage and reward contribution to the world of sake: Young Sake Ambassador and Sake Ambassador.

== See also ==
- London Sake Challenge
- Sake Sommelier of the Year
