= World Sake Day =

Japanese annual event

World Sake Day, also known as Sake Day, is an annual event held on October 1 as a tribute to sake, an alcoholic beverage of Japanese origin made of fermented rice. The event used to be regarded as only a national event in Japan. October 1 is traditionally the starting date of sake production in the country.

== See also ==
- List of food days
