= Sawanotsuru =

Sake brewing company based in Kobe, Japan

Sawanotsuru Co., Ltd.
- Company type: Kabushiki gaisha
- Industry: Sake brewing
- Founded: 1717
- Headquarters: Kobe, Japan
- Website: http://www.sawanotsuru.co.jp/

Sawanotsuru Co. Ltd (沢の鶴株式会社) is one of Japan’s largest producers of sake. The company was founded in 1717 in Nada-ku, Kobe, a region famous for sake production. According to Sawanotsuru Co., its sake is exported to approximately 30 countries.

== Origins ==
The name Sawanotsuru, meaning "crane of the swamp," comes from Japanese mythology. After princess Yamatohime-no-mikoto (倭姫命) moved the shrine of the sun goddess to its present location at Ise, she came across a white crane in a swamp. The crane held a sheaf of rice in its beak and presented it to the princess. The princess bid the god Isawatominokami (伊佐波登美神) to brew sake from the rice and offer it to the sun goddess. She then declared the crane to be Ōtoshinokami (大歳神), God of Grains, establishing the Izawanomiya Shrine (伊雑宮) for it, as a sub-shrine of Ise Shrine.

According to the brewery's website, in addition to this story, the image of a crane in a swamp is also meant to evoke a world wet, sun-lit, and rich with life, where the crane rests before taking flight again.

== Products ==
Within Sawanotsuru's range of products, there are 27 types of sakes which have been brewed, differing according to the type of ingredients and the brewing process. These amount to 35 sizes altogether.

== Awards ==
Sawanotsuru has participated in the Monde Selection Awards from the 25th World Selection in 1987 and since then has won many awards. The company temporarily stopped participation in 1995 due to the Great Hanshin earthquake but continued soon after.

In 2007, Sawanotsuru received the Crystal Prestige Trophy in the 45th World Selection, which is awarded in recognition to companies who have participated and produced consistent quality over the past 10 years. The entire Sawanotsuru Co. product range has also managed to win five Grand Gold Medals and 41 Gold Medals over the years for many of its products, with its Daiginjo Zuicho sake claiming the most awards.

== Sawanotsuru Museum ==
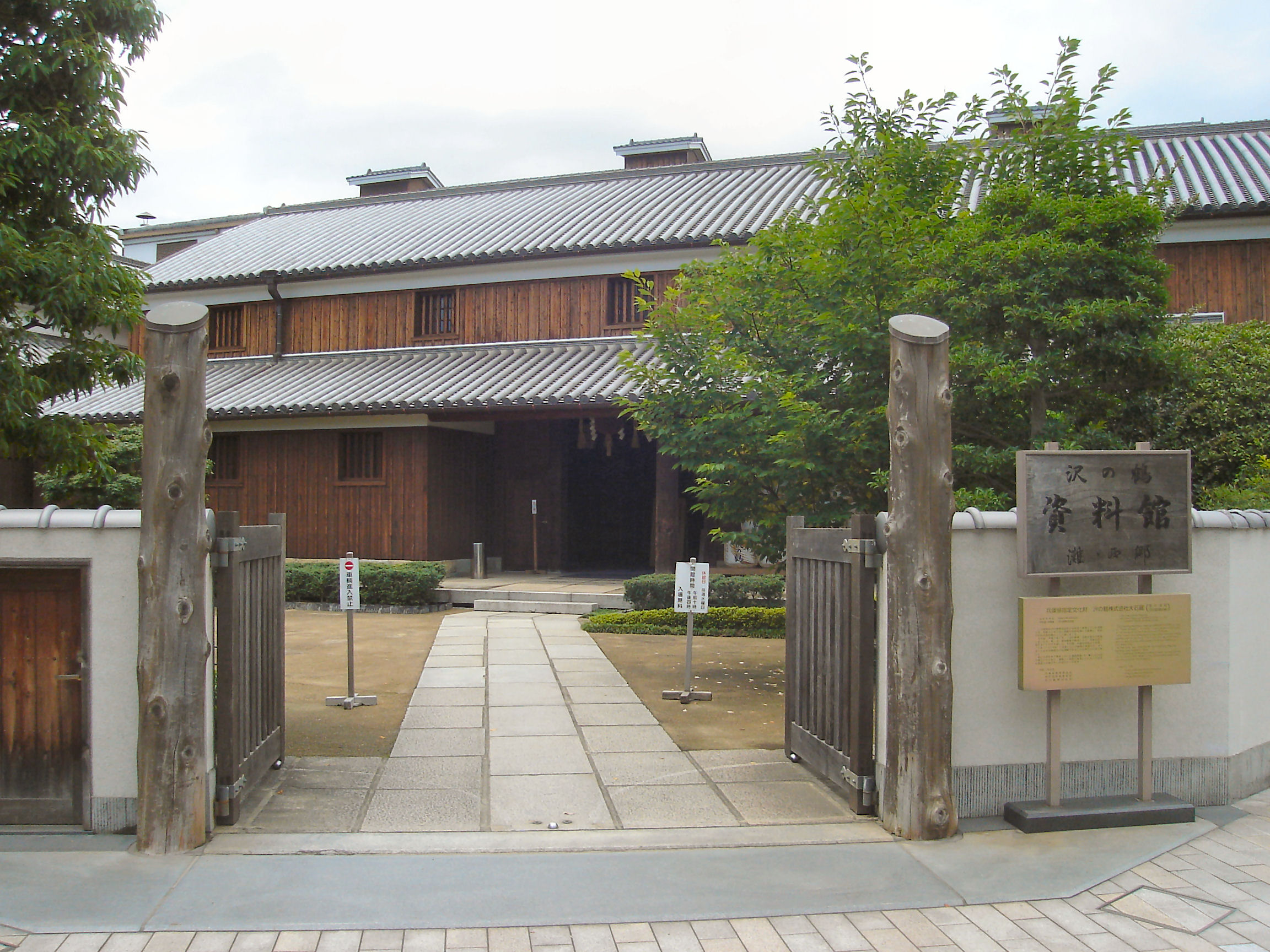
Sawanotsuru Sake Museum

The Sawanotsuru Museum was opened in November 1978, with the aim of leaving the history of sake brewing to future generations. In March 1980, both the museum and the sake brewing tools held within it were designated as "Important Tangible Folk Cultural Properties" by Hyogo Prefecture.

In the Great Hanshin earthquake, the museum was completely destroyed and was not reopened again until March 1999, three years and seven months later. The new museum is now designed to be earthquake-proof.

== International distributors ==
- United Kingdom: Cathay Importers (London) Ltd
- Singapore: Kirei Japanese Food Supply (S) Pte. Ltd.
- France: Kanae
- Germany: SSP Trade & Consult GmbH
- Italy: Wa-sabi S.r.l.
- Switzerland: Nishi's Japan Shop
- USA: NISHIMOTO TRADING CO., LTD
