= London Sake Challenge =

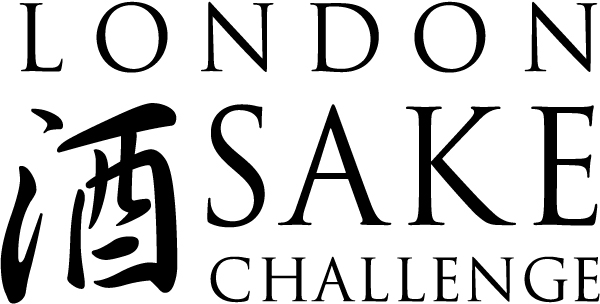
- Competition Logo
- Location: London
- Country: United Kingdom
- Presented by: Sake Sommelier Association
- Rewards: Gold, Silver and Bronze medals
- First award: 2012
- Website: http://www.londonsakechallenge.com/index-en.html

The London Sake Challenge (LSC), established in 2012 by the Sake Sommelier Association and its founders Xavier Chapelou and Kumiko Ohta, is an annual sake competition held in London and worldwide. The Challenge is the first competition of its kind, dedicated only to sake, in Europe. Products submitted from breweries all over Japan are evaluated by sake sommeliers from around the world and judged by taste, quality, labelling and packaging. The first competition took place on 20 August 2012, during 2012 London Olympic Games. Sake Challenges are held worldwide, including Milano Sake Challenge, Bordeaux Sake Challenge, Bangkok Sake Challenge and Tokyo Sake Challenge.

== Competition ==
The purpose of the event is to recognise outstanding premium sakes. The event aims to promote the consumption of sake by highlighting a new market where sake is matched with local food.The event also seeks to increase public awareness and popularity of the sake in the world with the "Japan Life" event.

Every sake is assessed independently, not comparatively. Sake sommeliers and jury members evaluate each sake by scoring appearance, flavour and taste in the first round of blind tasting. Labelling and packaging are assessed separately in the second round. Sake sommeliers score sakes from 0 to 5 stars.

== Reward ==
The competition awards platinum, gold, silver and bronze medals to the highest scoring sakes in accordance with the judging criteria. Award winners receive correspondent medal stickers.

== See also ==
- Sake Sommelier Association
- Sake Sommelier of the Year
