= Yamada Nishiki =

Japanese rice

'Yamada Nishiki'
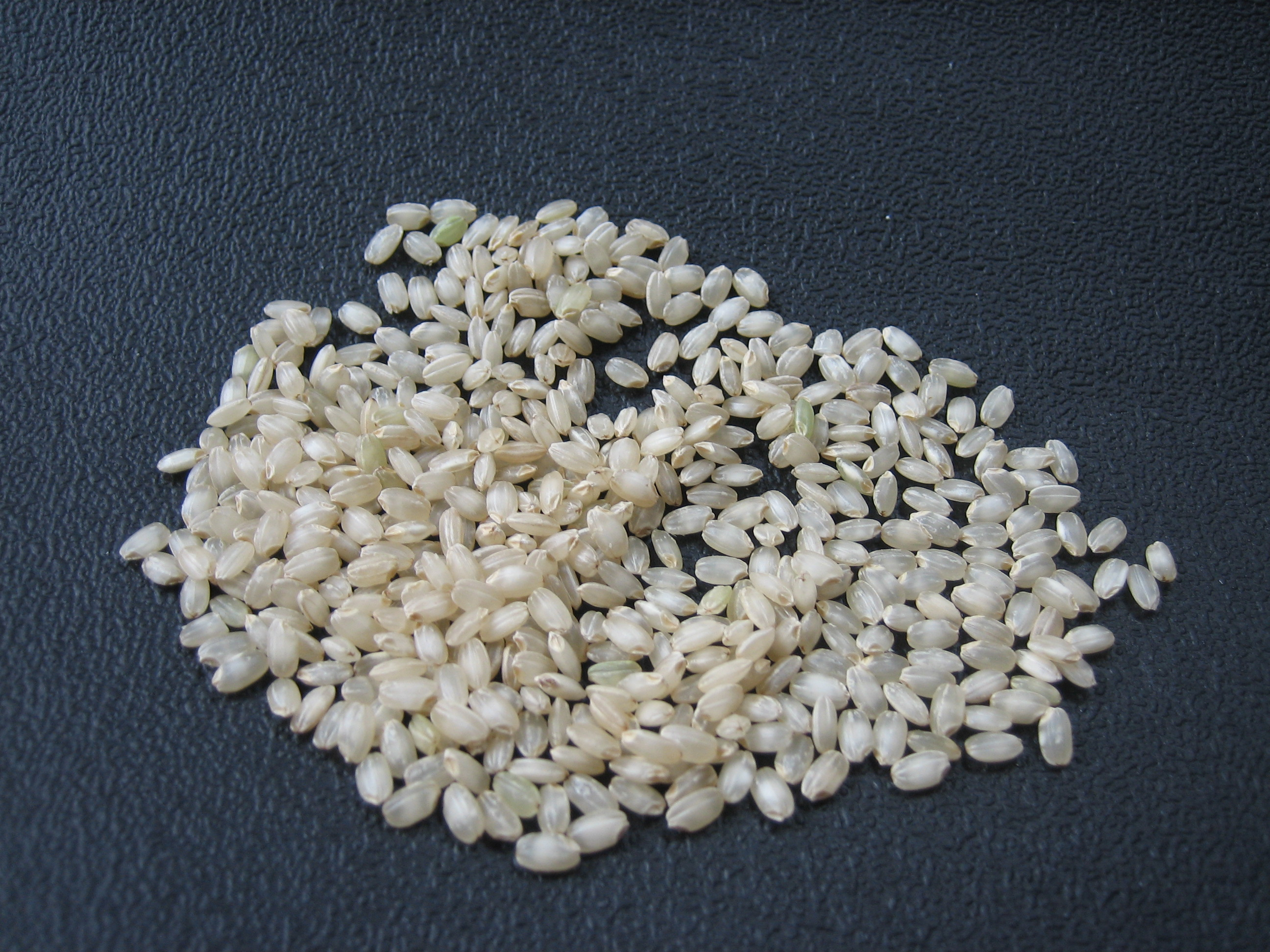
- Species: Oryza sativa
- Hybrid parentage: 'Yamadaho' × 'Tankan wataribune'
- Cultivar: 'Yamada Nishiki'
- Origin: Japan, 1936

Yamada Nishiki (Japanese: 山田錦) is a short-grain Japanese rice famous for its use in high-quality sake. Sake brewers particularly desire it for its ability to absorb water and dissolve easily.

Yamada Nishiki is the most commonly grown sake rice (sakamai). In 1923, Yamada Nishiki was created by crossing Yamadaho and Tankanwataribune. In 1936, the rice was named Yamada Nishiki. This special rice is mainly grown in the Hyogo prefecture, where it originated, but also Okayama and Fukuoka prefectures.

== See also ==
- Japanese rice
- Japanese cuisine
- Shōchū
