= Kōji (food) =

Fermentation starter

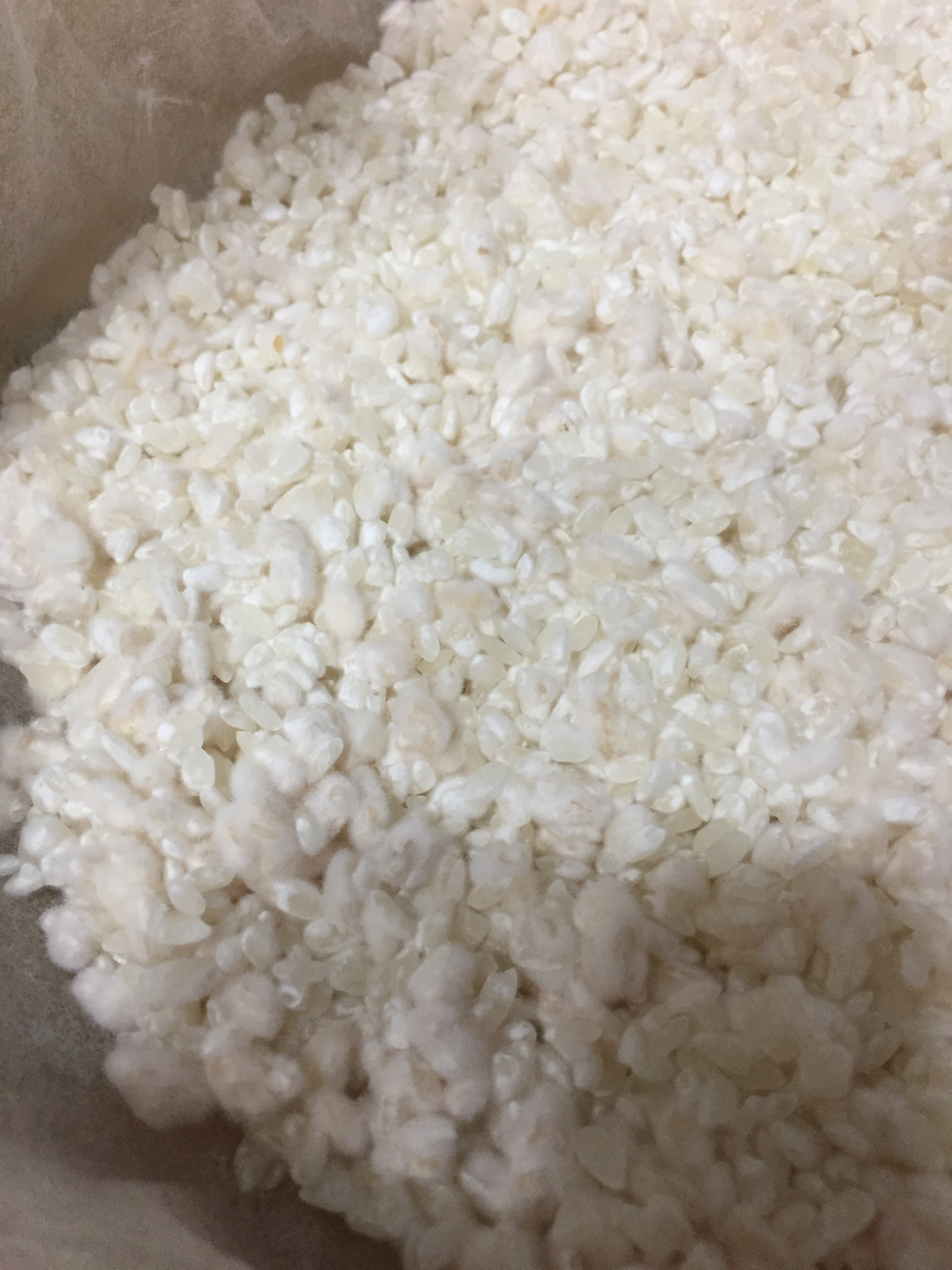
Koji grown on rice

Kōji (Japanese: 麹; rōmaji: kōji, also written as the kokuji 糀) is a filamentous fungus, most commonly Aspergillus oryzae, which is traditionally used in Japanese cuisine for the fermentation of food, or a mixture of such a culture with wheat and soybean meal. The latter can be fried and eaten directly or processed to a sauce.

The term kōji in English refers specifically to the Japanese types of starter cultures. The same Chinese character (Chinese: 麹; pinyin: qū, more commonly written as the homophonic 曲 in simplified Chinese texts) is used in Chinese to refer to Chinese starter cultures; see jiuqu.

In Japanese, the genus Aspergillus is known with the common name of kōji mold (麹黴(コウジカビ), kōji kabi), though the term is not fully limited to the genus (for example, Monascus purpureus is called 紅麹黴 "red kōji mold").

== Characteristics ==
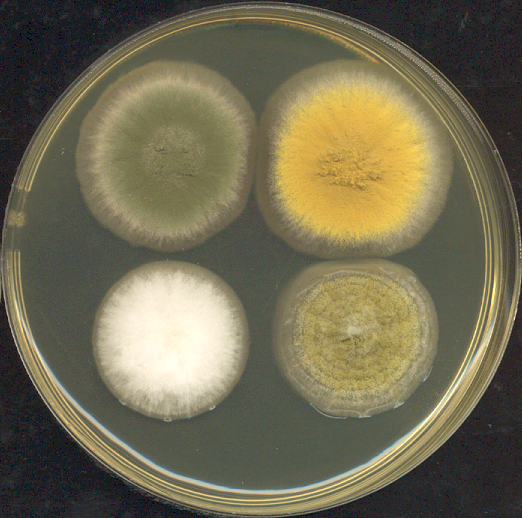
Four Aspergillus species in a Petri dish. The bottom two are strains of A. oryzae.

Various types of kōji are used, including yellow, black, and white. The kōji is stored for two to three days at 30°C under high humidity to allow A. oryzae to grow. In this process, the starch from cereals such as wheat, buckwheat or barley as well as from sweet potato is split into glucose, creating a sweet taste. The amino acids glutamic acid and to a lesser extent also aspartic acid split off from the proteins during fermentation, resulting in a strong umami taste. Depending on the Aspergillus used, culture substrate and culture conditions (temperature, pH value, salt content, humidity), different products are created in terms of composition, flavour and odour. Kōji can be freeze-dried and crushed to produce spores. Dried kōji-spores can be stored and transported light-protected at room temperature.

=== Yellow kōji ===
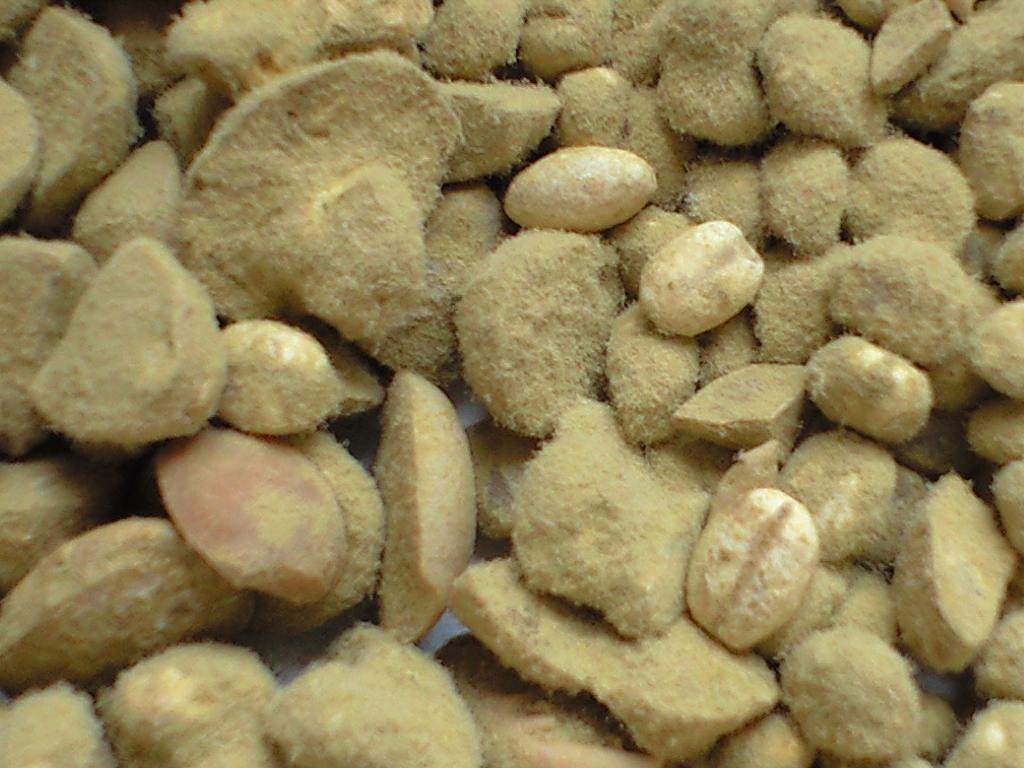
Aspergillus sojae on soybeans and wheat

Yellow kōji is used, among other things, for the production of soy sauce, miso, sake, tsukemono, jiang, makgeolli, meju, tapai, kōji-amazake, rice vinegar, mirin, shio koji and natto. Typically, for the production of soy sauce (shoyu), soybeans and sometimes also wheat are swollen in water, steamed, and possibly mixed with wheat bran roasted at 160–180 °C and ground. The enrichment with kōji creates a moist mash.

There are three Aspergillus species that are used as yellow kōji:

- Aspergillus flavus var. oryzae (キコウジキン / 黄麹菌 'ki kōji-kin'). The growth range of this species includes pH values from below 2 to above 8, a temperature optimum of 32–36 °C, a temperature minimum of 7–9 °C and a temperature maximum of 45–47 °C. The colony color is initially yellow-green, later more or less brown.
- Aspergillus sojae (醤油麹菌 'shōyu-kōji-kin')
- Aspergillus tamarii

A. oryzae has three α-amylase genes, which allows it to break down starch relatively quickly into glucose. In contrast, A. sojae has only one α-amylase gene under a weak promoter and the CAAT box has a gene expression attenuating mutation (CCAAA instead of CCAAT). In general, A. oryzae has higher levels starch-degrading enzymes (glucosidases) expression than A. sojae. A too-rapid release of glucose from starch at the beginning of fermentation inhibits the growth of the microorganisms in the soy sauce maturation phase, making the slower digestion beneficial to taste.

For the breakdown of proteins to amino acids, A. oryzae strain RIB40 has 65 endopeptidase genes and 69 exopeptidase genes, and A. sojae strain SMF134 has 83 endopeptidase genes and 67 exopeptidase genes. Protein-degrading enzymes (proteases) are more strongly expressed in A. sojae than in A. oryzae, consistent with adaptation to protein-rich feed. These genetic differences lead to significant differences in the odor profile.

A. sojae has higher enzyme activity of endopolygalacturonase (breaks down plant cell walls) and glutaminase (converts glutamine to glutamate) than A. oryzae. It has 10 glutaminase genes.

Various mutants of A. oryzae with altered properties were generated by irradiation or by the CRISPR/CAS method. Similarly, mutants of A. sojae with altered properties were generated by a variant of the CRISPR/Cas method or chemical mutagenesis.

=== Black & white kōji ===
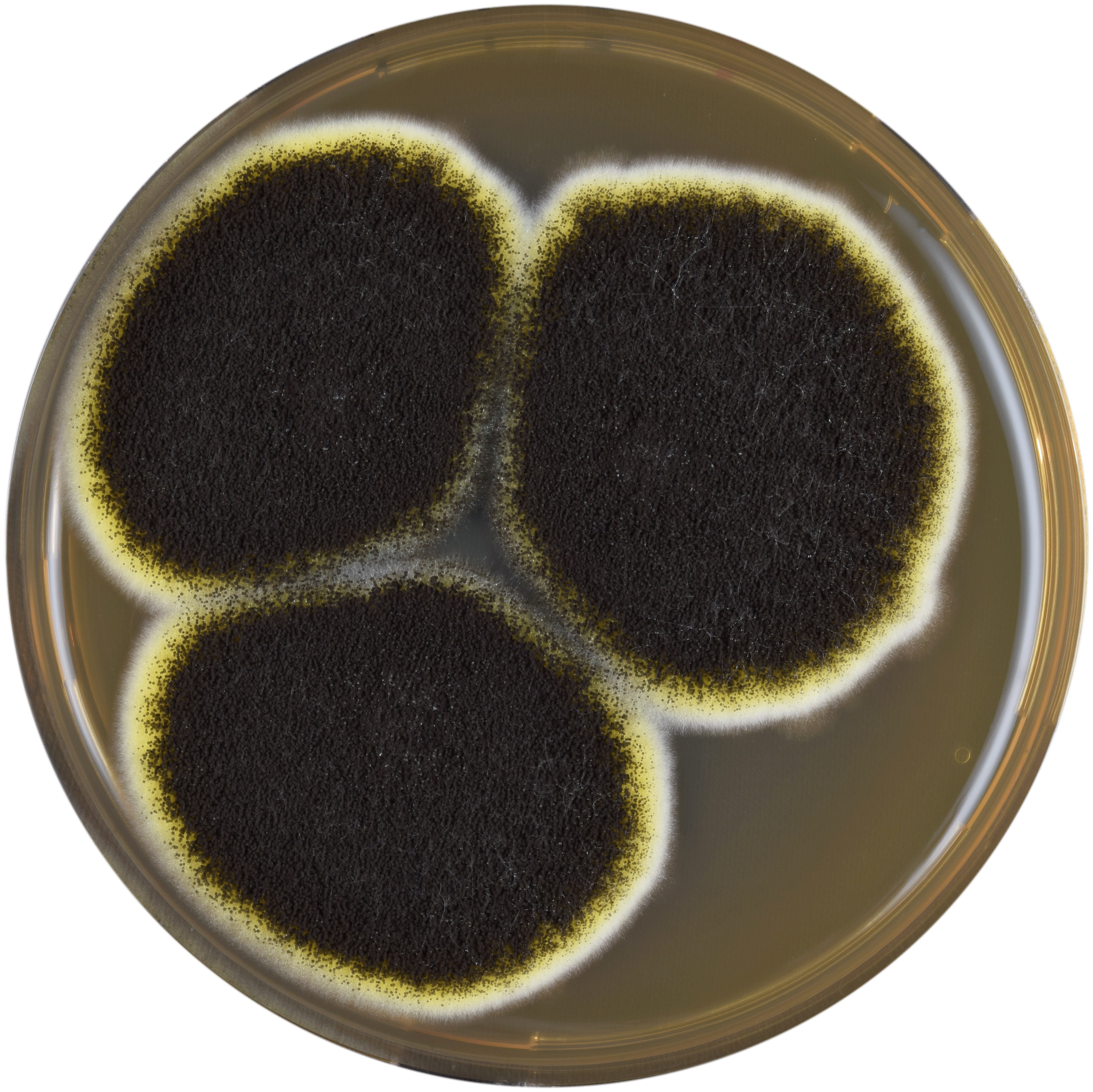
Aspergillus niger on MEAOX-Agar

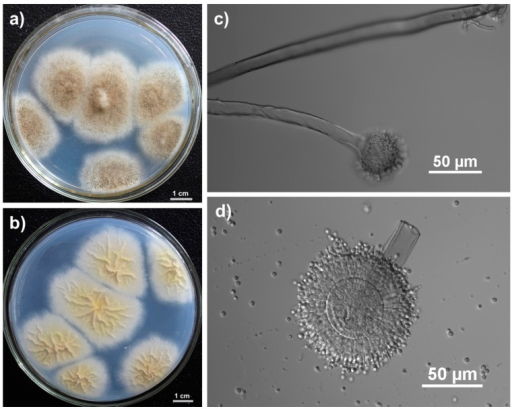
Aspergillus tubingensis on Czapek-Agar

Black kōji produces citric acid during fermentation, which inhibits the growth of unwanted microorganisms. It is typically used for the production of awamori.

There are three Aspergillus species that are used as black kōji:

- Aspergillus luchuensis (synonym Aspergillus awamori, Aspergillus inuii, Aspergillus nakazawai and Aspergillus coreanus, クロコウジキン / 黒麹菌 'kuro kōji-kin')
- Aspergillus niger (synonym Aspergillus batatae, Aspergillus aureus or Aspergillus foetidus, Aspergillus miyakoensis and Aspergillus usamii including A. usamii mut. shirousamii)
- Aspergillus tubingensis (synonym Aspergillus saitoi and A. saitoi var. kagoshimaensis)

White kōji (Aspergillus kawachii) is an albino variant of Aspergillus luchuensis. It is typically used in the production of shōchū.

== History ==
麹 (Chinese: qū, Japanese: kōji), which means mold used in fermented foods, was first mentioned in the Zhouli (Rites of the Zhou dynasty) in China in 300 BCE. Its development is a milestone in Chinese food technology, for it provides the conceptual framework for three major fermented soy foods: soy sauce, jiang/miso, and douchi, not to mention grain-based wines (including Japanese sake and Chinese huangjiu) and li (the Chinese forerunner of Japanese amazake). The process of making rice wine and fermented bean paste using molds was first documented in the 4th century B.C.

In 725 AD the Japanese book Harima no Kuni Fudoki (Geography and Culture of the Harima Province) first mentioned kōji outside of China and described that the Japanese produced kōji with fungal spores from the air. Around the 10th century, the kōji production method underwent a change and moved from the natural sowing system in rice to the so-called tomodane. This involved cultivating kōji until spores were released and using the spores to start a new batch of production. In the Meiji era, the integration of new microbiological techniques made it possible to isolate and propagate kōji in pure cultures for the first time. These advances facilitated the improvement of fungal culture quality and the selection of desirable characteristics.

It later became known that Kōji comprises different species of Aspergillus. Aspergillus oryzae was first described in 1878 as Eurotium oryzae Ahlb. and in 1883 as Aspergillus oryzae (Ahlb.) Cohn. Aspergillus luchuensis was first described in 1901 by Tamaki Inui at the University of Tokyo. Genichiro Kawachi isolated a colourless mutant of A. luchuensis (black kōji) in 1918 and named it Aspergillus kawachii (white kōji). Aspergillus sojae was first described as a distinct species in kōji in 1944. Initially, Aspergillus sojae was considered a variety of Aspergillus parasiticus because, unlike the other fungi of kōji, it had never been isolated from the soil.

== Traditional uses ==
Koji is widely used in traditional fermentation processes to create staple foods and condiments:

- Miso: A fermented soybean paste that is a cornerstone of Japanese cuisine. Its production involves combining koji (usually rice-based) with cooked soybeans and salt, followed by fermentation for weeks or even years. Enzymes in the koji break down complex proteins and carbohydrates in the soybeans, creating miso's rich and nuanced flavor. The fermentation time, type of koji, and additional ingredients all contribute to a wide variety of miso types, from sweet white miso to robust red miso. Miso adds depth and complexity to dishes such as soups, stews, marinades, and sauces.
- Sake: In sake production, koji converts rice starch into fermentable sugars. Unlike beer brewing, where saccharification and fermentation occur sequentially, sake brewing integrates these stages in a parallel fermentation environment. This dynamic interplay contributes to sake's unique flavor profile. Koji not only facilitates starch conversion but also develops nuanced aromas and flavors in the final product.
- Soy sauce: A fermented condiment derived from soybeans and wheat, with koji initiating enzymatic breakdown. Koji is cultivated on roasted wheat and soybeans and then mixed with salt water to create a brine called moromi, which ferments for months. Koji enzymes break down proteins and starches, contributing to soy sauce's umami flavor. After fermentation, the moromi is pressed, pasteurized, filtered, and bottled.

== Literature ==
- Kitagaki H (2021). "Medical Application of Substances Derived from Non-Pathogenic Fungi and -Containing". Journal of Fungi. 7 (4): 4. doi:10.3390/jof7040243. PMC 8063943. PMID 33804991.
- J. E. Smith (6 December 2012). Aspergillus. Springer US. pp. 46ff. ISBN 978-1-4615-2411-3.
