= Chu Hai =

Chu Hai may refer to:

- Chūhai, an alcoholic drink from Japan
- Hong Kong Chu Hai College, a tertiary education provider in Hong Kong
- Zhuhai, a city in China
