= XPNPEP2 =

Protein-coding gene in the species Homo sapiens

Identifiers
- Aliases: XPNPEP2, AEACEI, APP2, X-prolyl aminopeptidase (aminopeptidase P) 2, membrane-bound, X-prolyl aminopeptidase 2
- External IDs: OMIM: 300145; MGI: 2180001; GeneCards: XPNPEP2
Enzyme activity
EC #	BRENDA	ExPASy	KEGG	MetaCyc
3.4.11.9	↗	↗	↗	↗

Gene location (Human)
Chr.	X chromosome (human)
Band	Xq26.1	Start	129,738,949 bp
Band	Xq26.1	End	129,769,536 bp

Gene location (Mouse)
Chr.	X chromosome (mouse)
Band	X|X A4	Start	47,197,602 bp
Band	X|X A4	End	47,225,858 bp
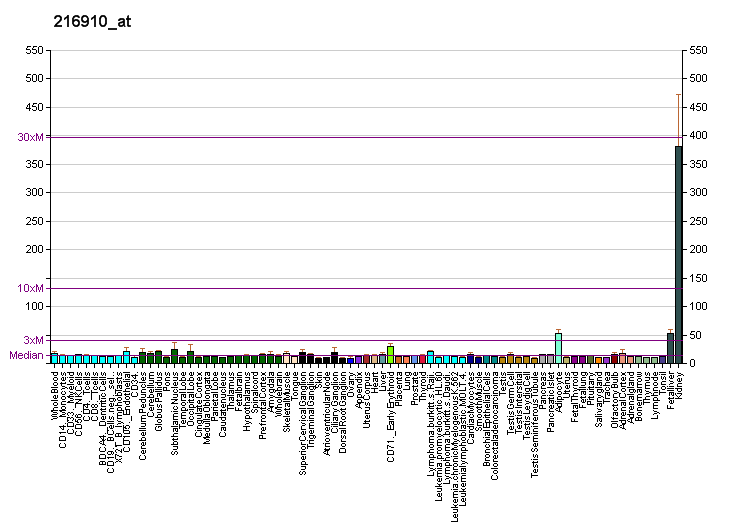

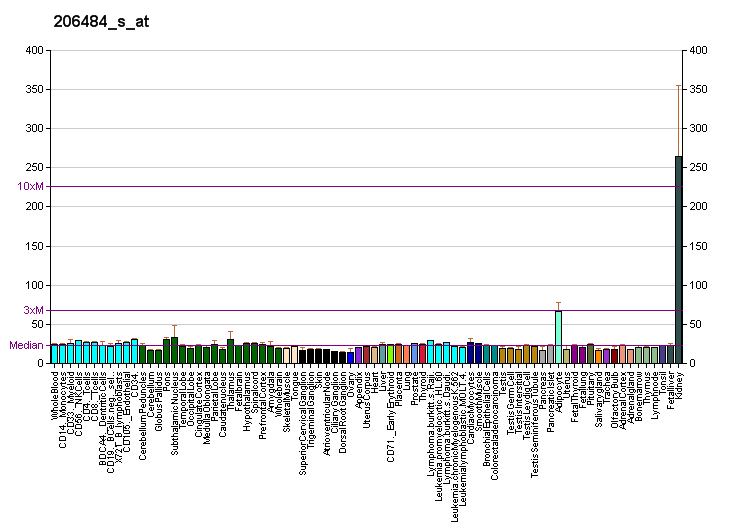
RNA expression pattern
Bgee	Human / Mouse (ortholog); Top expressed in: mucosa of ileum; jejunal mucosa; kidney tubule; glomerulus; human kidney; duodenum; metanephric glomerulus; gastric mucosa; right coronary artery; left coronary artery / Top expressed in: intestinal villus; jejunum; right kidney; ileum; proximal tubule; embryo; esophagus; duodenum; embryo; gray matter layer of cerebellum; More reference expression data
BioGPS	More reference expression data
Gene ontology
Molecular function	peptidase activity; aminopeptidase activity; hydrolase activity; metallopeptidase activity; metal ion binding; metalloaminopeptidase activity
Cellular component	anchored component of membrane; extracellular exosome; membrane; extracellular region; plasma membrane; cytoplasm
Biological process	proteolysis; C-terminal protein lipidation
Sources:Amigo / QuickGO
Orthologs
Databases	NCBI: entry; OMA: entry
Species	Human	Mouse
Entrez	7512	170745
Ensembl	ENSG00000122121	ENSMUSG00000037005
UniProt	O43895	B1AVD1
RefSeq (mRNA)	NM_003399	NM_001289729; NM_133213
RefSeq (protein)	NP_003390	NP_001276658; NP_573476
Location (UCSC)	Chr X: 129.74 – 129.77 Mb	Chr X: 47.2 – 47.23 Mb
PubMed search
- Wikidata
View/Edit Human	View/Edit Mouse

Xaa-Pro aminopeptidase 2 is an enzyme that in humans is encoded by the XPNPEP2 gene.

Aminopeptidase P is a hydrolase specific for N-terminal imido bonds, which are common to several collagen degradation products, neuropeptides, vasoactive peptides, and cytokines. Structurally, the enzyme is a member of the 'pita bread fold' family and occurs in mammalian tissues in both soluble and GPI-anchored membrane-bound forms. A membrane-bound and soluble form of this enzyme have been identified as products of two separate genes.
