= DNPEP =

Protein-coding gene in humans

Identifiers
- Aliases: DNPEP, ASPEP, DAP, aspartyl aminopeptidase
- External IDs: OMIM: 611367; MGI: 1278328; GeneCards: DNPEP
Available structures
PDB	Ortholog search: PDBe RCSB
PDB	List of PDB id codes 4DYO
Enzyme activity
EC #	BRENDA	ExPASy	KEGG	MetaCyc
3.4.11.21	↗	↗	↗	↗

Gene location (Human)
Chr.	Chromosome 2 (human)
Band	2q35	Start	219,372,043 bp
Band	2q35	End	219,400,022 bp

Gene location (Mouse)
Chr.	Chromosome 1 (mouse)
Band	1|1 C4	Start	75,284,540 bp
Band	1|1 C4	End	75,294,634 bp
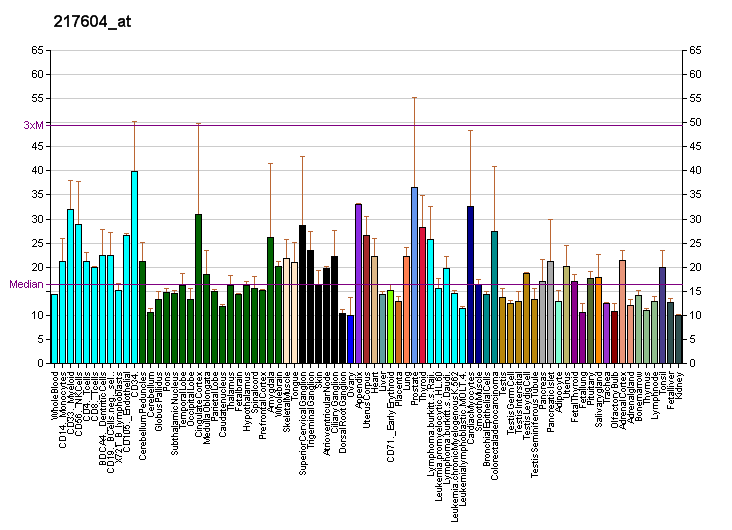

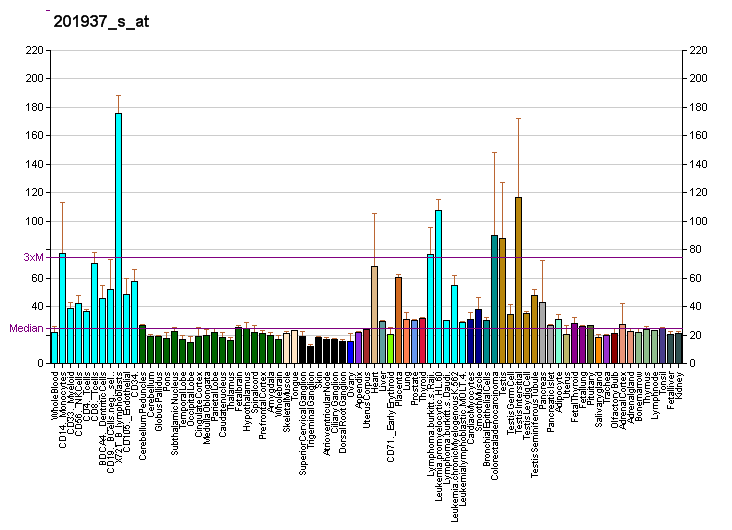

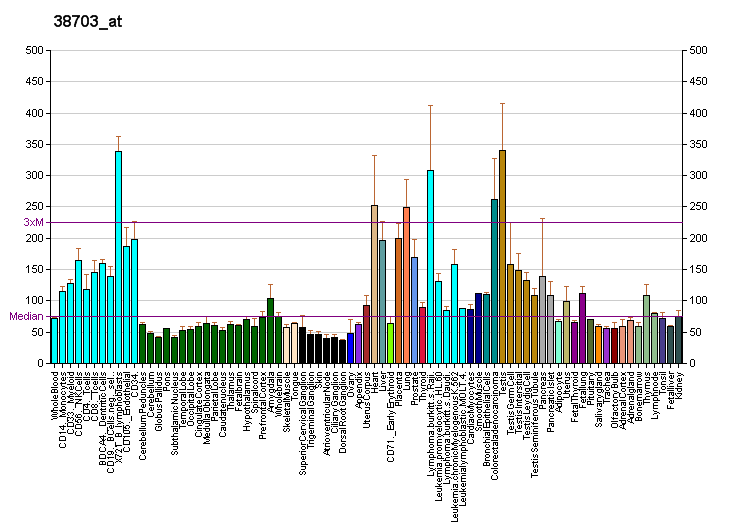
RNA expression pattern
Bgee	Human / Mouse (ortholog); Top expressed in: left testis; right testis; canal of the cervix; gastric mucosa; apex of heart; mucosa of transverse colon; right ovary; left uterine tube; upper lobe of left lung; ectocervix / Top expressed in: intestinal villus; internal carotid artery; external carotid artery; Rostral migratory stream; epithelium of small intestine; aortic valve; ascending aorta; lobe of prostate; gastrula; endocardial cushion; More reference expression data
BioGPS	More reference expression data
Gene ontology
Molecular function	peptidase activity; zinc ion binding; aminopeptidase activity; protein binding; hydrolase activity; metallopeptidase activity; metal ion binding; metalloaminopeptidase activity; identical protein binding
Cellular component	blood microparticle; nucleus; cytosol; cytoplasm; extracellular region
Biological process	proteolysis; peptide metabolic process
Sources:Amigo / QuickGO
Orthologs
Databases	NCBI: entry; OMA: entry
Species	Human	Mouse
Entrez	23549	13437
Ensembl	ENSG00000123992	ENSMUSG00000026209
UniProt	Q9ULA0	Q9Z2W0
RefSeq (mRNA)	NM_012100; NM_001319116; NM_001319117; NM_001319118; NM_001319119 NM_001319120; NM_001319121; NM_001319122	NM_001110831; NM_016878
RefSeq (protein)	NP_001306045; NP_001306046; NP_001306047; NP_001306048; NP_001306049 NP_001306050; NP_001306051; NP_036232; NP_001306050.1; NP_001306051.1	NP_001104301; NP_058574
Location (UCSC)	Chr 2: 219.37 – 219.4 Mb	Chr 1: 75.28 – 75.29 Mb
PubMed search
- Wikidata
View/Edit Human	View/Edit Mouse

Aspartyl aminopeptidase is an enzyme that in humans is encoded by the DNPEP gene.

== Function ==
The protein encoded by this gene is an aminopeptidase which prefers acidic amino acids, and specifically favors aspartic acid over glutamic acid. It is thought to be a cytosolic protein involved in the general metabolism of intracellular proteins.
