= Aminopeptidase Ey =

Class of enzymes

Identifiers
- EC no.: 3.4.11.20
- CAS no.: 9031-94-1

Databases
- IntEnz: IntEnz view
- BRENDA: BRENDA entry
- ExPASy: NiceZyme view
- KEGG: KEGG entry
- MetaCyc: metabolic pathway
- PRIAM: profile
- PDB structures: RCSB PDB PDBe PDBsum
Search
- PMC: articles
- PubMed: articles
- NCBI: proteins

Aminopeptidase Ey (EC 3.4.11.20) is an enzyme. This enzyme catalyses differs from other aminopeptidases in broad specificity for amino acids in the P1 position and the ability to hydrolyse peptides of four or five residues that contain Pro in the P1' position

This enzyme is zinc glycoprotein.
