= Aspergillus luchuensis =

Scientific classification
- Kingdom: Fungi
- Division: Ascomycota
- Class: Eurotiomycetes
- Order: Eurotiales
- Family: Aspergillaceae
- Genus: Aspergillus
- Species: A. luchuensis

Binomial name
- Aspergillus luchuensis Inui, 1901

Synonyms
- Heterotypic synonyms: Aspergillus aureus var. acidus Nakaz., Simo & A.Watan., 1936; Aspergillus foetidus var. acidus (Nakaz., Simo & A.Watan.) Al-Musallam, 1980; Aspergillus acidus (Nakaz., Simo & A.Watan.) Varga et al., 2011; Aspergillus awamori Nakaz., 1911; var. ferrugineus Nakaz., Simo & A.Watan., 1936; var. fumeus Nakaz., Simo & A.Watan., 1936; var. fuscus Nakaz., Simo & A.Watan., 1936; var. minimus Nakaz., Simo & A.Watan., 1936; var. piceus Nakaz., Simo & A.Watan., 1936; Aspergillus coreanus var. rubeolus Yu et al., 2004; Aspergillus luchuensis var. rubeolus Y.K.Shih; Non-synonyms: NRRL 4948^{NT} (→ Aspergillus welwitschiae): Aspergillus niger subsp. awamori (Nakaz.) Al-Musallam; Aspergillus niger var. awamori (Nakaz.) Al-Musallam

Species of fungus

Aspergillus luchuensis is a species of fungus in the genus Aspergillus. It belongs to the group of black Aspergilli which are important industrial workhorses. The fungus has been used to make awamori, a distilled spirit in Okinawa Island, Japan, and is also used to make shōchū and sake. This species was first isolated and described by Tamaki Inui of the University of Tokyo in 1901. For more than 100 years there has been confusion between this species and Aspergillus awamori and Aspergillus niger with regard to scientific names and classification.

The scientific name for this species is derived from "Ryukyu" (Japanese 琉球, earlier Chinese 流求 — pinyin Liúqiú, Wade-Giles Liu²-ch’iu²), the historical name for Okinawa, Japan. It is authorized as a "national fungi" (国菌, kokkin) along with Aspergillus oryzae, Aspergillus sojae and Aspergillus kawachii by the Scientific Conference of Brewing Society Japan because it is used not only in brewing but also in a variety of foods and is useful in the lives of Japanese people.

Its genome has been sequenced by two different research groups, first in 2016, and then in 2017. The first sequencing of the A. luchuensis genome reported a genome assembly size of 34.7 Mbp and reported the presence of 11,691 genes.

== Taxonomic history ==
In 1901, Inui described a black Aspergillus (black kōji) from awamori-koji, which he called Aspergillus luchuensis; the type strain was deposited as NBRC 4281. In 1911, Nakazawa isolated a morphologically very similar fungus also from awamori-koji, which he called Aspergillus awamori and deposited as JCM 2261（IAM 2112); the only described difference was the phialides.

In April 1920, a strain NBRC 4314 (RIB 2604), originally isolated from awamori in 1901 by Usami, was stored as A. awamori at Hiroshima University and the IFO (Institute for Fermentation, Osaka). This strain would have its genome sequenced in 2016.

Because JCM 2261 was not accessible to most researchers, many researchers used a morphologically similar strain NRRL 4948 as the neotype strain of a A. niger var. awamori (=A. awamori), using it as the baseline in their understanding of "A. awamori". This strain is however more similar to the Brazilian Aspergillus niger (actually most similar to Aspergillus welwitschiae), having nothing to do with actual awamori in its origin. The result is that strains labelled as "A. awamori" by similarity to sequences labelled "A. awamori" include not only a real awamori-derived group, but also a lot of A. niger, leading to much confusion (a nomen ambiguum).

The status of black kōji fungi was finally resolved in 2013 by an international collaboration of Yamada from Japan, Hong from South Korea, Samson from the Netherlands, and others. The living cultures and dead remains of archived strains labelled A. awamori were examined by PCR and other molecular methods. They were found to be a DNA match of A. luchuensis and totally different from A. niger. Because the name A. luchuensis predates A. awamori by 10 years, it was chosen as the correct name of this fungus as a matter of nomenclatural priority.

A more detailed history of this species (and other black Aspergillus) is given in Hong, Yamada and Samson (2014).

=== Remaining confusion ===
Despite the corrections around 2013, NCBI GenBank still retains the neotype designation of NRRL 4948 as Aspergillus awamori, and as a result the name remains a nomen ambiguum. A 2019 genome of NRRL 4948 under this name adds to the problem. The ATCC also continues to sell a "Aspergillus awamori" WB 4948.

As a result of this confusion, care should be exercised in interpreting the name Aspergillus awamori: if the strain IFM 58123 = NRRL 4948 = CBS 557.65 is used as the type, the name refers to Aspergillus welwitschiae and not A. luchuensis.

== White mutant ==
In 1918, Genichiro Kawachi isolated an albino mutant of Aspergillus luchuensis (black kōji) and named it Aspergillus kawachii (white kōji). This mutant is now also called Aspergillus luchuensis mut. kawachii.

== Uses ==
=== Brewing ===
In shōchū brewing, Aspergillus oryzae (yellow kōji) was traditionally used, but black and white kōji produced more citric acid and were more effective in preventing microorganism growth, so the use of black kōji was recommended from the 1940s and white kōji from the 1950s. Brewing with each type of kōji brings different flavors to shōchū.

Sake was also traditionally brewed with yellow kōji, but from the 21st century sake brewed with white or black kōji began to appear.

The black kōji variants and white kōji that Kawachi discovered and isolated have been used in makgeolli and soju in Korea since the 1940s.

== See also ==
- Aspergillus awamori
