= Mizuwari =

Spicy whiskey cocktail

- Type: Cocktail
- Ingredients: 2 US fluid ounces (59 ml) whiskey; 5 US fluid ounces (150 ml) water
- Base spirit: Whiskey
- Standard drinkware: Highball glass
- Served: On the rocks: poured over ice
- Preparation: pour whisky into a highball glass, add a suitable amount of ice, pour in a desired amount of water, gently stir to combine.

Mizuwari (Japanese: 水割り, "cut with water") is a popular way of drinking spirits in Japan. Typically, about two parts of cold water are mixed with one part of the spirit and some ice. The practice comes from Japanese shochu drinking traditions but is also a very popular way of drinking whisky.

A closely related way is to substitute cold water with hot water, in what is known as Oyuwari (お湯割り, "cut with hot water").
