= Glutamyl aminopeptidase =

Class of enzymes

ENPEP

Identifiers
- Aliases: ENPEP, APA, CD249, gp160, glutamyl aminopeptidase
- External IDs: OMIM: 138297; MGI: 106645; GeneCards: ENPEP
Available structures
| PDB | Ortholog search: PDBe RCSB |
| PDB | List of PDB id codes 4KXD, 4KXA, 4KXB, 4KX7, 4KX9, 4KXC, 4KX8 |
Enzyme activity
| EC # | BRENDA | ExPASy | KEGG | MetaCyc |
|---|---|---|---|---|
| 3.4.11.7 | ↗ | ↗ | ↗ | ↗ |

Gene location (Human)
| Chr. | Chromosome 4 (human) |
| Band | 4q25 | Start | 110,365,733 bp |
| Band | 4q25 | End | 110,565,285 bp |

Gene location (Mouse)
| Chr. | Chromosome 3 (mouse) |
| Band | 3 G3|3 57.92 cM | Start | 129,062,824 bp |
| Band | 3 G3|3 57.92 cM | End | 129,126,369 bp |
RNA expression pattern
| Bgee | Human / Mouse (ortholog); Top expressed in: jejunal mucosa; glomerulus; metanephric glomerulus; mucosa of ileum; kidney tubule; human kidney; duodenum; gonad; liver; placenta / Top expressed in: vestibular sensory epithelium; stria vascularis; ileum; utricle; jejunum; migratory enteric neural crest cell; renal corpuscle; intestinal villus; epithelium of small intestine; left lung lobe; More reference expression data |
| BioGPS | n/a |
Gene ontology
| Molecular function | peptide binding; zinc ion binding; metal ion binding; peptidase activity; aminopeptidase activity; hydrolase activity; metallopeptidase activity; metalloaminopeptidase activity |
| Cellular component | integral component of membrane; membrane; apical part of cell; integral component of plasma membrane; lysosomal membrane; apical plasma membrane; brush border; extracellular exosome; cytoplasmic vesicle; external side of plasma membrane; plasma membrane; cytoplasm |
| Biological process | cell-cell signaling; glomerulus development; proteolysis; angiogenesis; cell population proliferation; regulation of systemic arterial blood pressure by renin-angiotensin; cell migration; peptide catabolic process; angiotensin maturation |
Sources:Amigo / QuickGO
Orthologs
| Databases | NCBI: entry; OMA: entry |
| Species | Human | Mouse |
| Entrez | 2028 | 13809 |
| Ensembl | ENSG00000138792 | ENSMUSG00000028024 |
| UniProt | Q07075 | P16406 |
| RefSeq (mRNA) | NM_001977 | NM_007934 |
| RefSeq (protein) | NP_001968; NP_001366540; NP_001366541; NP_001366542 | NP_031960 |
| Location (UCSC) | Chr 4: 110.37 – 110.57 Mb | Chr 3: 129.06 – 129.13 Mb |
| PubMed search |
- Wikidata
| View/Edit Human | View/Edit Mouse |

Glutamyl aminopeptidase (EC 3.4.11.7) is an enzyme that in humans is encoded by the ENPEP gene.

Glutamyl aminopeptidase is a zinc-dependent membrane-bound aminopeptidase that catalyzes the cleavage of glutamatic and aspartatic amino acid residues from the N-terminus of polypeptides. The enzyme degrades vasoconstricting angiotensin II into angiotensin III and therefore helps to regulate blood pressure.

== Alternative names ==
The enzyme has had a number of other names, including aminopeptidase A, aspartate aminopeptidase, angiotensinase A, glutamyl peptidase, Ca^{2+}-activated glutamate aminopeptidase, membrane aminopeptidase II, antigen BP-1/6C3 of mouse B lymphocytes, L-aspartate aminopeptidase, and angiotensinase A2. The human gene has also been designated CD249 (cluster of differentiation 249)
