= Chūhai =

Alcoholic drink from Japan

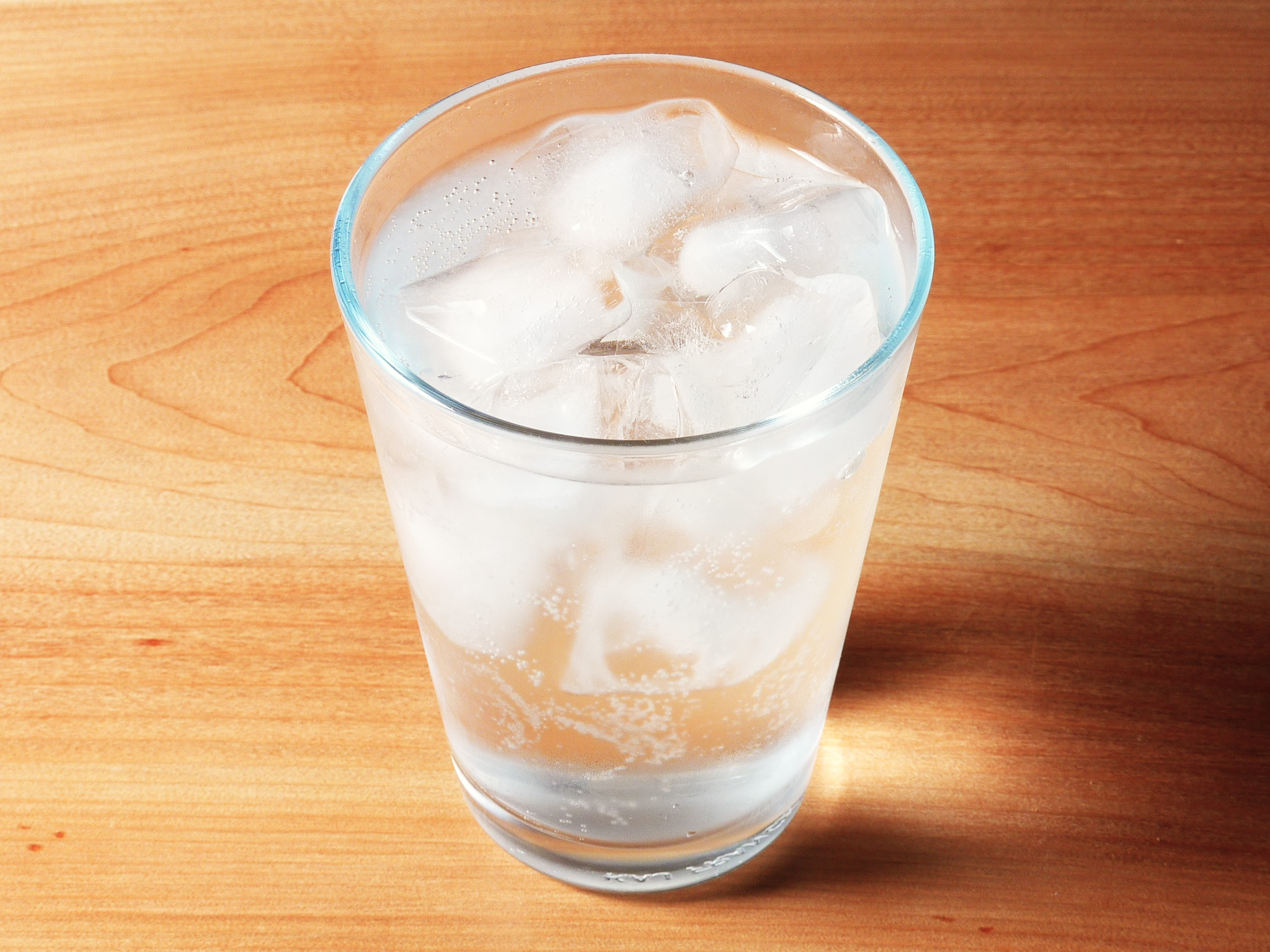
Chūhai

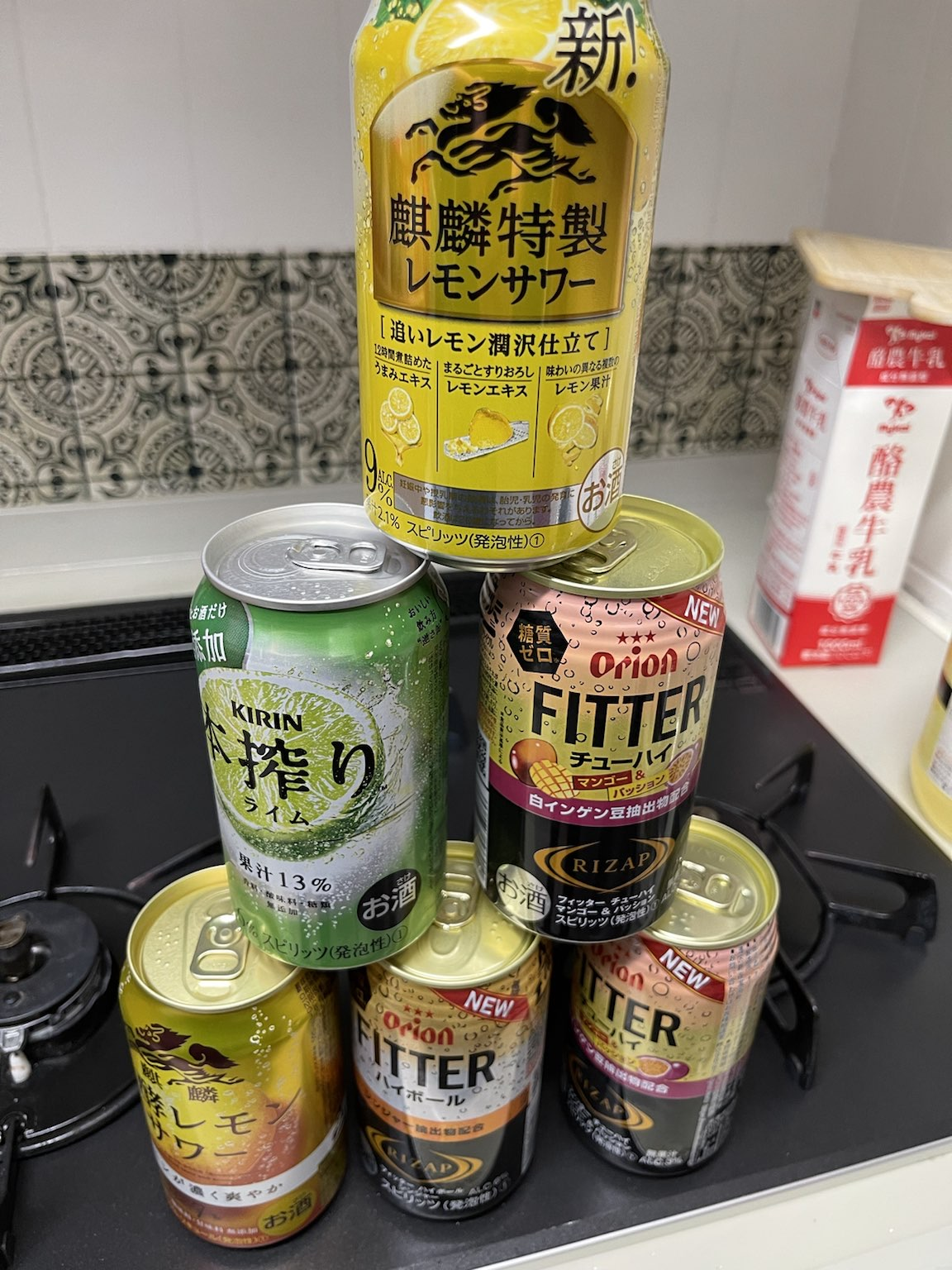
Different chūhai canned drinks from Japan

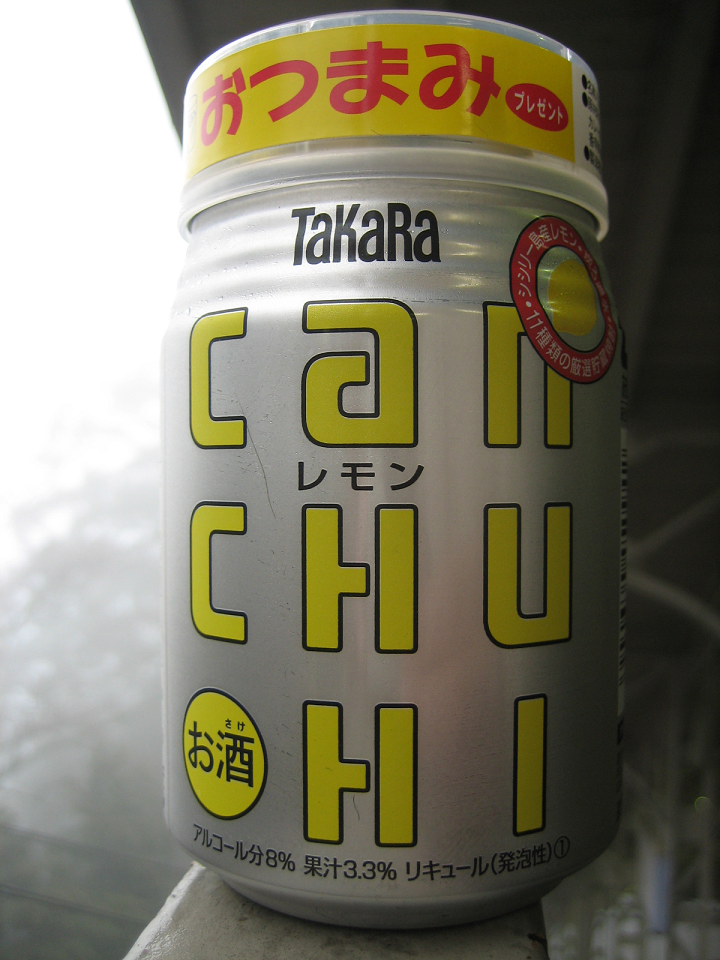
A can of lemon flavored "Chu-hi" with complimentary peanuts attached to the top

Chūhai (チューハイ or 酎ハイ), an abbreviation of "shōchū highball" (焼酎ハイボール), is an alcoholic drink originating from Japan.

Traditional chūhai is made with barley shōchū and carbonated water flavored with lemon, but some modern commercial variants use vodka in place of shōchū, and beverage companies have diversified into a variety of flavors, including lime, grapefruit, apple, orange, pineapple, grape, kyoho grape, kiwi, ume, yuzu, lychee, peach, strawberry cream, and cream soda.

The alcohol content of chūhai sold in bars and restaurants can be quite low, allowing those with a low tolerance for alcohol to drink safely. Canned chūhai, however, can have higher levels of alcohol and is often sold in convenience stores and from vending machines. Although the amount varies (usually starting at 3%), canned chūhai contains less than 10% alcohol in Japan, as anything higher triggers a higher tax rate. Chūhai is served in tall glasses or mugs as drinks for individuals, making it less social than other traditional Japanese bar drinks like sake, beer, or whisky, which can be shared by pouring portions from a large bottle. Fresh chūhai or nama chūhai (生酎ハイ) is also sometimes served, featuring fresh-squeezed juice; in some cases guests squeeze their own juice. Due to the high sugar content, the number of calories in each bottle can be quite high compared to other alcoholic beverages.

In March 2018, Coca-Cola announced it would begin selling a chūhai product in Japan called Lemon-dou.

== Availability in United States ==
Takara Sake produces three flavors (white peach, lychee and grapefruit) of canned chuhai under the JPOP label that are available in the United States. Sangaria also produces two flavors (lemon and grapefruit) of canned chuhai for the US market.

Yabai, based out of Santa Monica, CA, is America's first domestic chu-hai. Currently they are offered in three flavors, are 5% ABV, and made with imported shochu.

== See also ==
- Hard seltzer
- Queen Mary (cocktail)
