= Shōchū =

Distilled alcoholic beverage from Japan

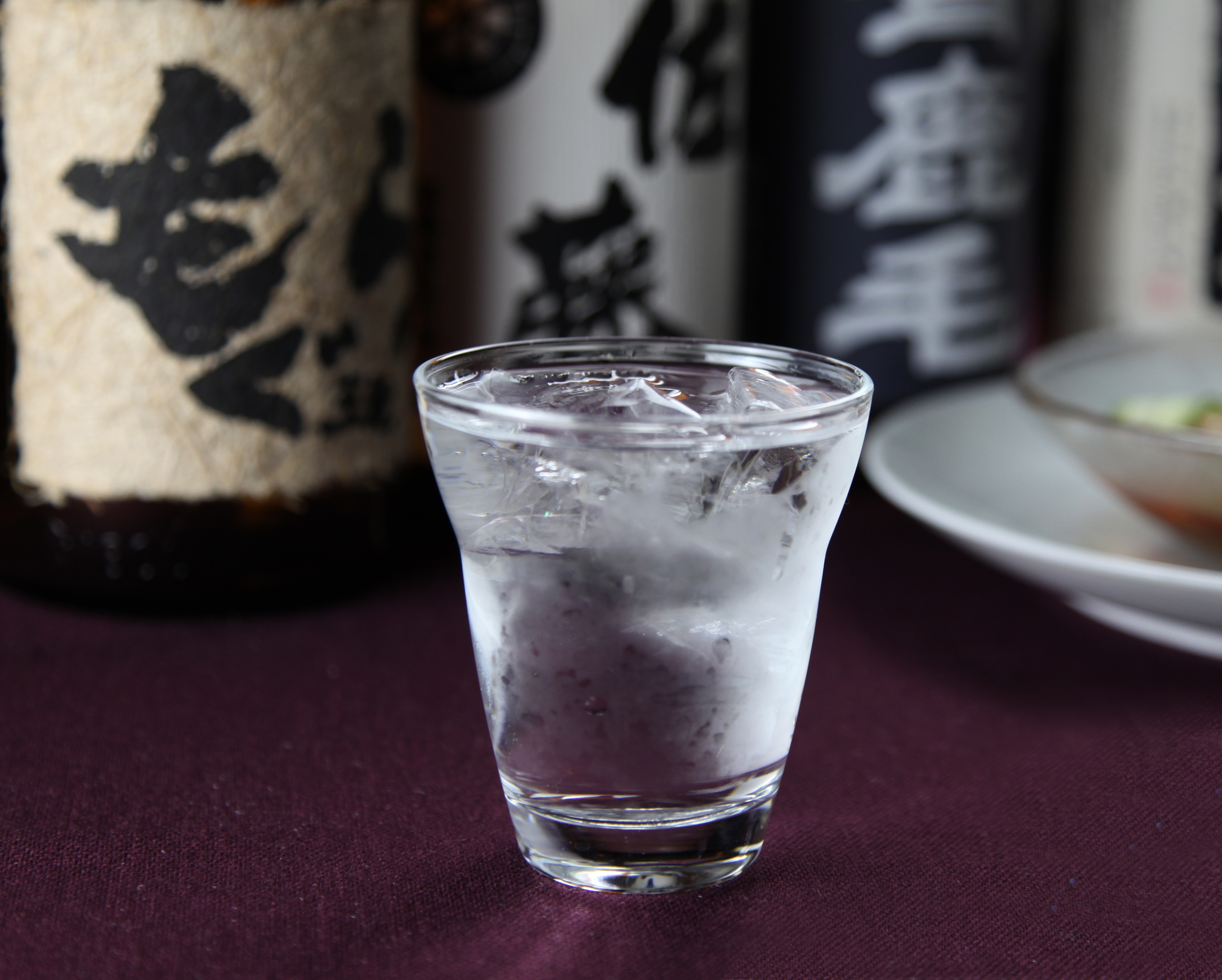
- A glass of shōchū
- Type: Spirit
- Origin: Japan, East Asia
- Alcohol by volume: 25–35%
- Proof (US): 50–70
- Color: Clear
- Ingredients: Rice, barley, sweet potatoes, buckwheat, Aspergillus kawachii, Aspergillus luchuensis, Aspergillus oryzae, etc.
- Related products: Baijiu, soju, sake

Shōchū (Japanese: 焼酎) is a Japanese distilled beverage. It is typically distilled from rice, barley, sweet potatoes, buckwheat, or brown sugar, though it is sometimes produced from other ingredients such as chestnut, sesame seeds, potatoes, or even carrots.

Typically shōchū contains 25% alcohol by volume, which is weaker than baijiu, whiskey, or vodka, but stronger than huangjiu, sake, or wine. It is not uncommon for multiply distilled shōchū, which is more likely to be used in mixed drinks, to contain up to 35% alcohol by volume.

== Etymology ==
The word shōchū (焼酎) is the Japanese rendition of the Chinese shaojiu (燒酒), meaning "burned liquor", which refers to the heating process during alcohol distillation. The word is a cognate of the Korean soju.

== Culture ==
=== Drinking ===
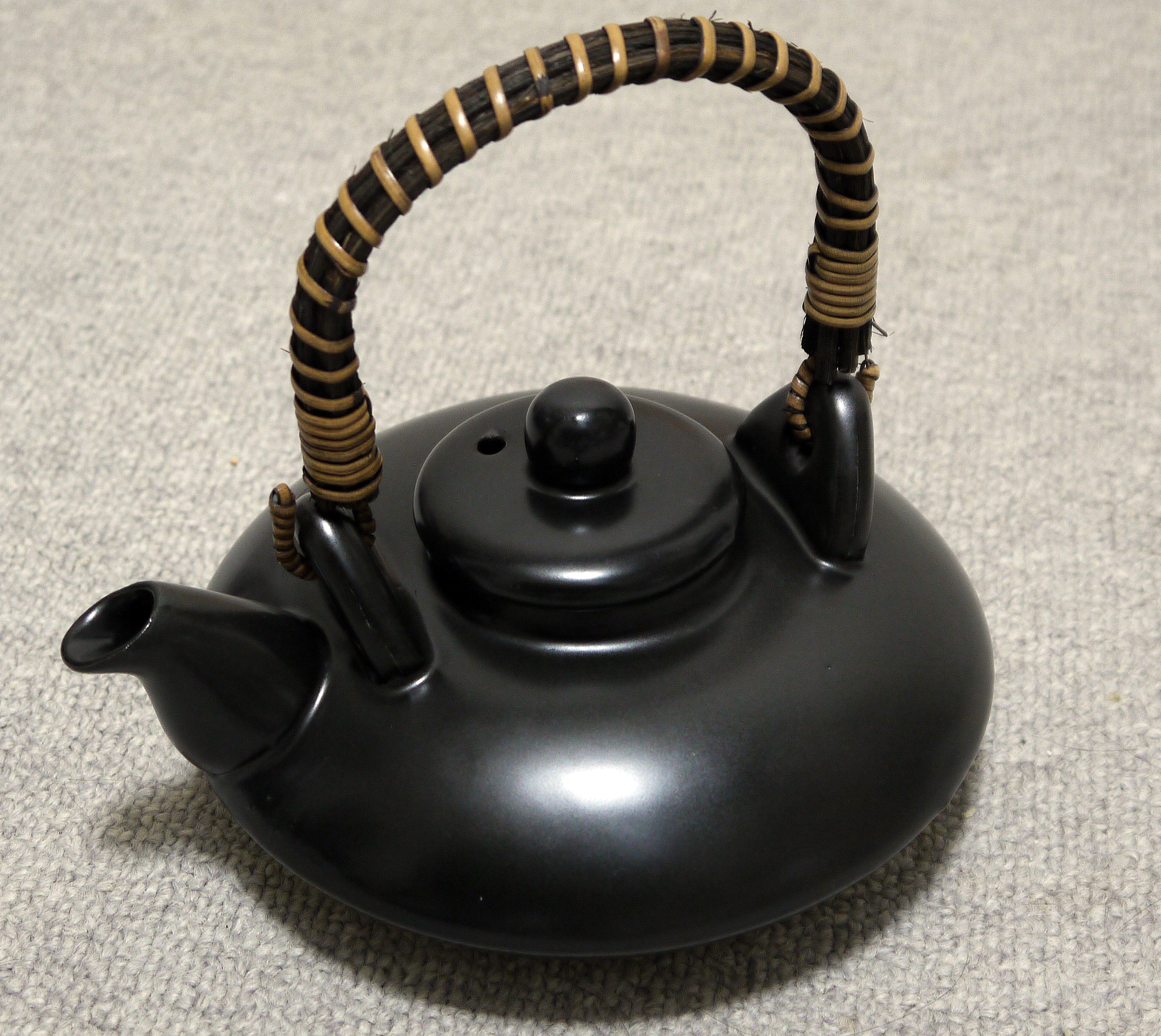
Choka: kettle to make hot shōchū

Shōchū should not be confused with sake, a brewed rice wine. Its taste is usually far less fruity and depends strongly on the nature of the starch used in the distilling process. Its flavor is often described as "nutty" or "earthy".

Shōchū is drunk in many ways according to season or personal taste:

- neat, i.e., on its own with nothing added
- on the rocks, i.e., mixed with ice, known in Japanese as "rokku"
- diluted with room-temperature water (水割り mizuwari) or hot water (お湯割り oyuwari),
- mixed with oolong tea or fruit juice
- as chūhai (shōchū highball), a mixed drink consisting of shōchū, soda water, ice and some flavoring, often lemon, grapefruit, apple or ume (East Asian plum)
- mixed very cold with a beer-flavored mixer known as Hoppy

Shōchū is widely available in supermarkets, liquor stores, and convenience stores in Japan, while canned chuhai drinks are sold in some of Japan's ubiquitous vending machines. However, it is more difficult to find shōchū outside Japan except in urban areas with larger Japanese populations. Interest in shōchū has begun to grow in North America, particularly in cosmopolitan cities such as Los Angeles, San Francisco, Vancouver, Toronto, and New York. Dedicated shōchū bars have begun to appear in New York and more than 100 brands are now available in the U.S. market.

In Kyūshū, the center of production, shōchū is far more common than sake. Indeed, there, "sake" (酒) generally refers to shōchū, and is sometimes consumed mixed with hot water (oyuwari), especially in cooler months. First, hot water is poured into the glass, then shōchū is gently added. The liquids mix naturally and stirring is unnecessary. Typically, when serving a standard 25% ABV shōchū oyuwari, the amount of shōchū exceeds the amount of hot water and is enjoyed for its aroma. Occasionally, shōchū and water are mixed, left to stand for a day, then gently heated. This traditional pre-dilution technique is known as maewari in Japan.

=== Boom ===
The early 21st century witnessed a consumer boom in shōchū within Japan, and in 2003 domestic shipments surpassed those of sake for the first time. Shōchū bars appeared serving shōchū exclusively, and premium brands with a focus on particular ingredients, production methods, or aging techniques entered the market. The beverage has undergone a change of image; formerly it was seen as an old-fashioned drink, but now has become trendy amongst young drinkers, particularly women. The boom also caused a serious shortage of sweet potatoes, a basic ingredient of some popular types of shōchū and, with the emergence of expensive premium brands, pricing scams appeared.

In 2005 the Japanese television drama Kiken na Aneki illustrated this change in drinking habits. Its plot centered on the Minagawa family of Miyazaki Prefecture, who were brewers of a sweet-potato shōchū called imojōchū. The lead character, Hiroko (Ito Misaki), spends the majority of the series trying to come up with enough money to save the distillery from loan sharks, but in the process becomes involved with corporate distilleries. The larger companies formulate an advertising campaign that results in the imojōchū becoming a popular drink. In this fictional account, the beverage is marketed to young women when it previously had been mostly consumed by the older male generation.

There are several reasons for shōchū's recent popularity. With increasing health-consciousness, many people see it as healthier than some alternatives. There have been well-publicized claims of medical benefits, including that it can be effective in preventing thrombosis, heart attacks, and diabetes. It is also a versatile drink that is suited to most styles of cuisine.

Shigechiyo Izumi, a Japanese citizen who apparently lived to be 120 (though the claim is disputed), made shōchū part of his daily dietary regimen. This practice was mentioned, along with his record, in the Guinness Book of World Records. Because of his intimate passion for shōchū, many have speculated that shōchū is healthy and can actually promote longevity. This even prompted some Ryūkyū shōchū brewers to market a special "Longevity Liquor" (長寿の酒) shōchū bearing his name on the front label. Despite these claims, Izumi's personal physician strongly advised against drinking shōchū, as his kidneys were not strong enough to process shōchū in his advanced age. But Izumi went on to say: "Without shōchū there would be no pleasure in life. I would rather die than give up drinking."

== History ==
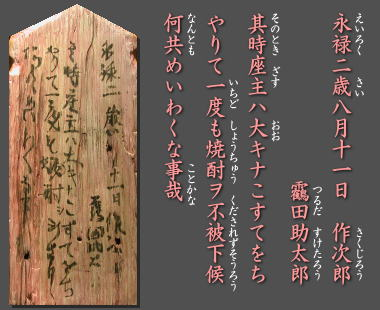
Shōchū graffiti at Kōriyama Hachiman shrine. Furigana is shown to the right. It is signed by two carpenters and dated August 11 of the 2nd year of the Eiroku period, i.e. 1559.

Shōchū production has been historically attested to since the 16th century. When the missionary Francis Xavier visited Kagoshima Prefecture in 1549, he recorded that "the Japanese drink arak is made from rice [...] but I have not seen a single drunkard. That is because once inebriated they immediately lie down and go to sleep."

The oldest existing direct reference to shōchū in Japan can be found at Kōriyama Hachiman shrine in Isa, Kagoshima. There, two carpenters working on the shrine in 1559 inscribed the following graffiti on a wooden plank in the roof: "The high priest was so stingy he never once gave us shōchū to drink. What a nuisance!"

From these early times through to the Edo period shōchū was produced throughout Japan in the traditional kasutori way, using single pot distillation. During the Meiji period, the column still was introduced to Japan from Great Britain, making affordable mass production of high-purity multiply distilled shōchū possible during a time of chronic rice shortages. Shōchū made the traditional way was called "old-style shōchū" and that produced using the new multiple-distillation machinery "new-style shōchū."

In the early 20th century, Hajime Katahira (1884–1936), Minosuke Kurose (1882–1967), and Tsunekichi Kurose (1885–1925) in Kasasa Village in Kagoshima Prefecture established the Kurose Toji Guild. Through their experience in both Okinawan Awamori and sake production, these men revolutionized traditional shochu production through the introduction of black koji (A. awamori) and multi-stage fermentation. Prior to this multistage fermentation process, shochu was made in the donburi style with both koji inoculated grains and the main ingredients added to a single fermentation. Today, almost all authentic shochu is made with a multi-stage fermentation. At its peak, the Kurose Toji Guild boasted more than 500 members who would travel throughout Japan to produce shochu from local agricultural ingredients.

Tamaki Inui (1873–1946), a lecturer at University of Tokyo, succeeded in the first isolating and culturing aspergillus such as A. kawachii, A. awamori and a variety of subtaxa of A. oryzae. His contemporary Genichirō Kawachi (1883–1948), who is said to be the father of modern shōchu with his development of the Kawachi Drum koji machine, isolated white koji, also known as A. kawachii, which is named after him. These discoveries results in great progress in producing high quality shochu in Japan, but the Kawachi Drum machine and other innovations led to the eventual demise of the Kurose Toji Guild, which today has just a handful of active members, but primarily continues to live on in a museum in Kasasa Village. Aspergillus developed by Kawachi has also been used for soju and makgeolli in Korea.

== Definition and classification ==
Japan's alcohol taxation law, as revised in April 2006, defines two categories of shōchū (also called white liquor).

=== Multiply distilled shōchū ===
Alcohol distilled more than once with special machinery for that purpose, diluted for sale to an alcohol by volume level of less than 36%, that meets the following conditions:

1. Fruit or grain that has been allowed to germinate is not used as a base ingredient in whole or in part (preventing brandy and malt whisky from being considered shōchū).
2. It is not filtered through white birch charcoal.
3. If sugar is used as a base ingredient, in whole or in part, then the result of distillation must be at least 95% alcohol by volume (see discussion under brown sugar shōchū).
4. It is not infused with other ingredients during distillation (eliminates gin and other flavored spirits).

Until the 2006 revision the law referred to this category as kōrui shōchū (焼酎甲類, shōchū kōrui; "Class A shōchū"). Kōrui (Class A) in the classification of shōchū simply means classification and does not mean that the quality is superior to that of Otsurui (Class B).

It is generally distilled from a fermented liquid similar to molasses. Repeated distillation forms ethyl alcohol of high purity which is typically odorless and has a taste of little distinction. Water is then added, and the precise nature of this water has subtle effects on the taste and palatability of the shōchū.

Kōrui shōchū is made from sweet potato, potato, and corn. It is generally produced in modern large factories. Distillers make Kōrui shōchū by weakening the distilled alcohol.

The specialized distillation equipment, called a patent still lends it to mass production at low cost, so large corporations produce this kind of shōchū in high volume. In Japan, it retails in plastic bottles, cans, and paper cup form and is consumed as a cheap alcoholic drink. It forms the base of several cocktails and liqueurs such as chūhai and umeshu.

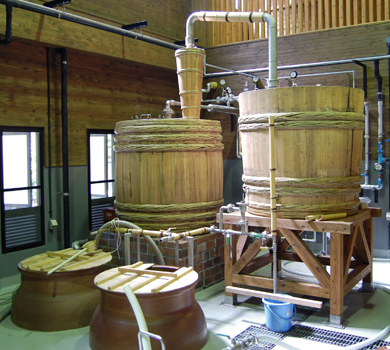
Single distillation. Wooden pot stills are most often used at smaller distilleries.

=== Singly distilled shōchū ===
Alcohol distilled using other than multiple-distillation machinery, with alcohol by volume of no more than 45%, from one of the following:

1. ferment whose primary ingredient is grain or potato and their kōji
2. ferment whose primary ingredient is grain kōji (see awamori)
3. ferment whose primary ingredient is sake lees, possibly with rice and/or its kōji (see kasutori shōchū)
4. ferment whose primary ingredient is sugar (restricted types) and rice kōji (see brown sugar shōchū)
5. ferment whose primary ingredient is grain or potato and their kōji along with other ingredients, provided the other ingredients form no more than 50% by weight
6. other substances with certain restrictions

Until the 2006 revision the law referred to this category as otsurui shōchū (焼酎乙類, shōchū otsurui; "Class B shōchū"), sometimes abbreviated to "otsushu" (乙焼). Otsurui (Class B) in the classification of shōchū simply means classification and does not mean that the quality is inferior to that of Kōrui (Class A).

The equipment used for single distillation is called a pot still. As the shōchū is distilled just once it retains the character of the base ingredient, typically rice, barley, or sweet potato, with a strong taste and aroma. Small-to-medium size enterprises make most brands, with the island of Kyūshū famous as the center of production. Recently however larger corporations have been entering the market.

==== Maturation ====
Shōchū is shipped after maturation. Maturation techniques vary in storage vessel and location, both of which affect the character of the shōchū. The most commonly used containers for aging shōchū are stainless steel tanks, clay pots, and wooden barrels or casks.

As a result of maturation, the flavor, and aroma of shōchū settle. Maturation generally takes between one and three months. Maturation from three to six months is called beginning maturation. During this period, sharp flavors in the shōchū generally decrease. Shōchū matured from six months to three years usually has a mellow taste.

A shōchū called long-term maturation is matured for more than three years. But long-term maturation does not always improve the flavor. On the other hand, long-term maturation is particularly effective for awamori. Distillers sometimes mature awamori for longer than ten years.

===== Locations =====
Shōchū is matured in various places to impart unique flavors, typically where there are minimal variations in temperature and humidity. These places include tunnels and limestone caverns.

==== Honkaku shōchū ====
Until 2006 Japanese postwar tax law classified shōchū into "kōrui" and "otsurui" types. The terms kō (甲) and otsu (乙) are Chinese celestial stems typically used for classification, and mean something akin to "Grade A" and "Grade B" respectively.

Fearing a tendency to believe that otsurui shōchū is somehow inferior to kōrui shōchū, the Kyūshū Otsurui Shochu Producers' Association lobbied the Ministry of Finance, and in 1962 succeeded in having honkaku shōchū (本格焼酎, honkaku shōchū), or authentic shōchū, recognized as an alternative name. The name is believed to have been coined in 1957 by Junkichi Enatsu, the president of Kirishima Brewery of Miyakonojō, Miyazaki Prefecture.

However, since the term was not formally defined naming disputes arose. As a result, on 1 November 2002, the law was clarified and shōchū satisfying any of conditions 1 to 5 of the above definition of singly distilled shōchū can be called honkaku shōchū. Those satisfying the final condition are excluded.

=== Shōchū consumption in Japan by categories ===
2023 Shōchū consumption in Japan by categories (tax base) is as follows;

Category	Domestic (kl)	Import (kl)	Total (kl)
Multiply distilled	271,375	29,615	300,990
Singly distilled	360,200	249	360,449
Total	631,575	29,864	661,439
(Sake)	387,100	64	387,164
(Whisky)	172,954	32,454	205,408

== Moromitori shōchū ==
Most singly distilled shōchū is moromitori shōchū (もろみ取焼酎). This name derives from its production process:

1. Raw material treatment. Usually, rice or barley is steeped in water, then steamed to promote starch gelatinization and cooled.
2. Kōji production. kōjikin, or koji mold spores, are cultivated onto the material to form koji mold which creates enzymes as it grows. The enzymes break starch molecules down into sugar molecules that can be fermented, a process called saccharification.
3. Primary fermentation. The koji is mashed by adding both water and yeast and is fermented for seven to nine days in a tank or vat to form unrefined alcohol, called moto or (first stage) moromi.
4. Secondary fermentation. The steamed main ingredient and water are added to the unrefined alcohol and fermented again to form (second stage) moromi. The ingredient added during this second stage determines the variety of shōchū; for example, if sweet potato is added then it becomes sweet potato shōchū.
5. Distillation. Purification of the unrefined moromi alcohol.

=== Kōji ===
Soba shōchū. The left hand side of the label promotes it as honkaku shōchū made from black kōji.

Kōji (麹) mold, a kind of Aspergillus fungus, has a profound effect on the final taste of the shōchū. There are three varieties of kōji mold with distinct characteristics.

- Yellow kōji (A. oryzae). Used to produce sake, and at one time all honkaku shōchū. However yellow kōji is extremely sensitive to temperature; its moromi can easily sour during fermentation. This makes it difficult to use in warmer regions such as Kyūshū, and gradually black and white kōji became more common. Its strength is that it gives rise to a rich, fruity refreshing taste, so despite the difficulties and great skill required it is still used by some manufacturers. It is popular amongst young people and those who previously had no interest in typically strong sweet potato shōchū, playing a role in its recent revival. Thus, white and black kōji are mainly used in the production of shōchū, but only yellow kōji (A. oryzae) is usually used in the production of sake.
- Black kōji (A. luchuensis) . Mainly used to produce shōchū and awamori. In 1901, Tamaki Inui of the University of Tokyo succeeded in the first isolating and culturing. In 1910, Genichirō Kawachi succeeded for the first time in culturing var. kawachi, a variety of subtaxa of A. awamori. This improved the efficiency of shochu production. It produces plenty of citric acid, which helps to prevent the souring of the moromi. Of all three kōji it most effectively extracts the taste and character of the base ingredients, giving its shōchū a rich aroma with a slightly sweet, mellow taste. Its spores disperse easily, covering production facilities and workers' clothes in a layer of black. Such issues led to it falling out of favor, but due to the development of New Kuro-kōji (NK-kōji) in the mid-1980s, interest in black kōji resurged amongst honkaku shōchū makers because of the depth and quality of the taste it produced. Several popular brands now explicitly state they use black kōji on their labels.
- White kōji (A. kawachii). Discovered as a mutation from black kōji by Genichirō Kawachi in 1918. This effect was researched and white kōji was successfully grown independently. White kōji is easy to cultivate and its enzymes promote rapid saccharization; as a result, it is used to produce most shōchū today. It gives rise to a drink with a refreshing, gentle, sweet taste.

=== Varieties ===
There is a broad variety of moromitori shōchū. Four locations have achieved protection as geographical indications under World Trade Organization TRIPS article 23 and are noted below.

==== Rice shōchū ====
Rice shōchū (米焼酎, komejōchū) shares its base ingredient with sake. It has a fairly thick taste, and appears to have originally developed in regions too warm for sake production.

Kumamoto Prefecture is particularly well known for its production of rice shōchū. Notably Kuma shōchū (球磨焼酎) produced in Hitoyoshi-bonchi is protected as a geographical indication.

Rice shōchū is also produced in regions famous for their sake, such as Niigata and Akita prefectures.

==== Barley shōchū ====
Barley shōchū (麦焼酎, mugishōchū) is generally less distinctive than rice shōchū and easy to drink. However, if cask-aged the taste can be quite sharp and strongly reminiscent of single-malt whisky.

Ōita Prefecture, Miyazaki Prefecture, and Iki in Nagasaki Prefecture are strong production hubs. Iki shōchū (壱岐焼酎) has also been given protection as a geographical indication.

==== Sweet potato shōchū ====
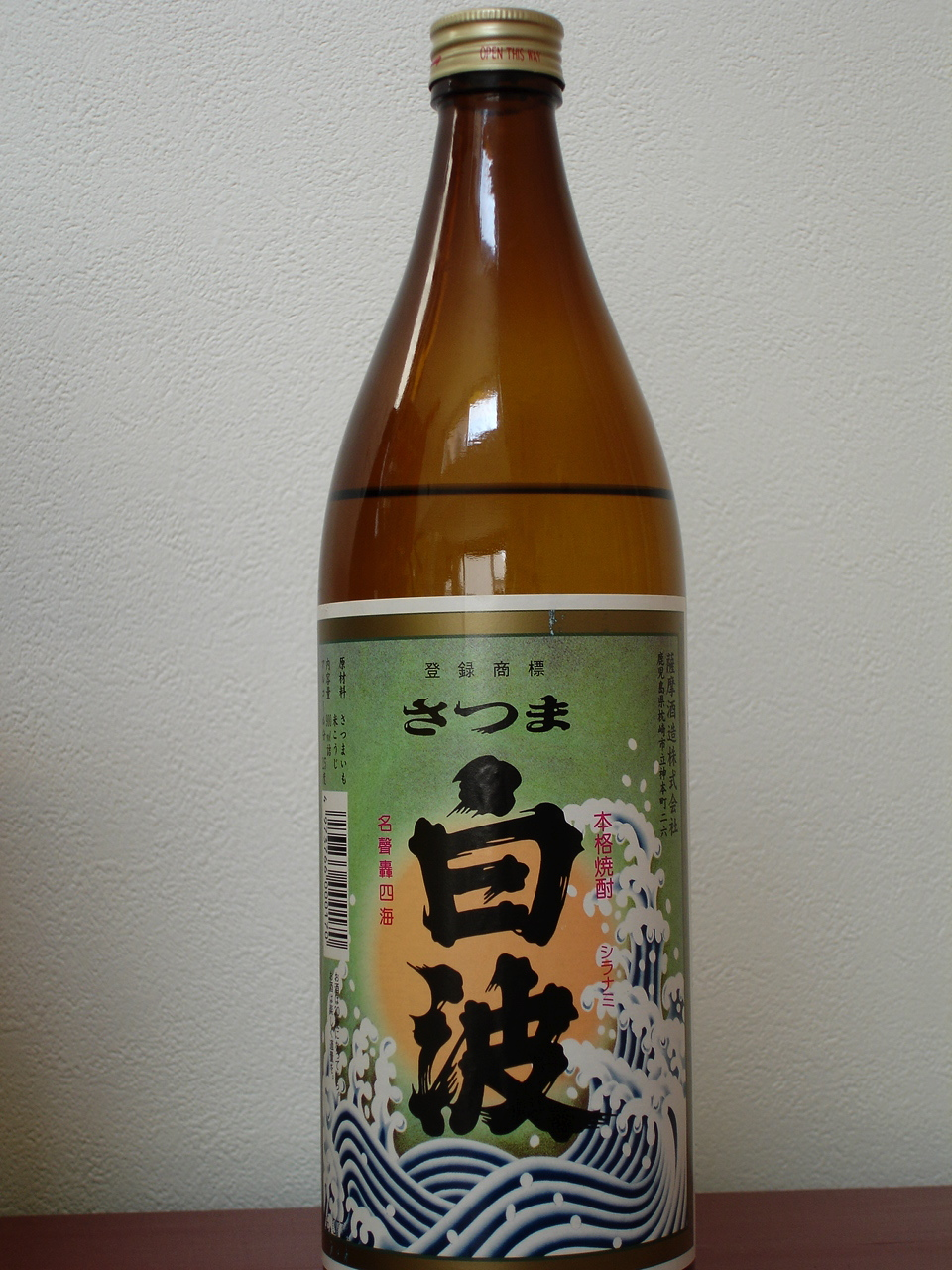
One brand of Satsuma shōchū

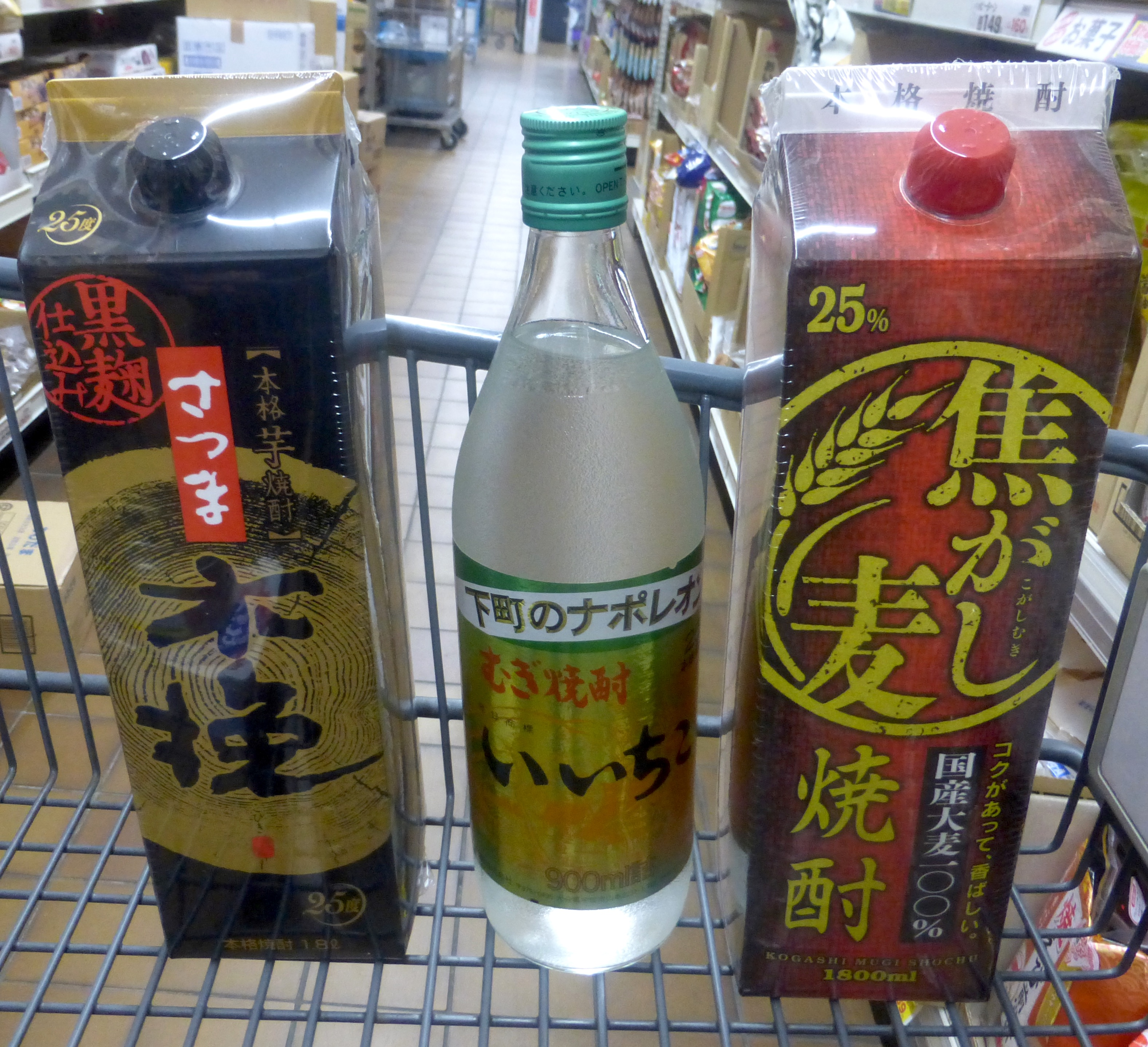
Various brands of shōchū

Sweet potato shōchū (芋焼酎, imojōchū) uses sweet potato, widely cultivated across southern Kyūshū since the Edo period, as its base ingredient. Originally it was almost exclusively produced in Kagoshima and Miyazaki prefectures, but nowadays is made across Japan using locally grown sweet potatoes.

It tends to have a strong taste and a distinctive smell; more recently producers have made varieties whose aroma is somewhat suppressed.

Kagoshima's Satsuma shōchū (薩摩焼酎) has been given protection under WTO rules as a geographical indication.

The 1956 film The Teahouse of the August Moon portrayed an American-occupied Okinawan village rebuilding its economy with sweet potato shōchū.

The taste of sweet potato shōchū is a bit smoky, evocative of some whiskeys.

==== Brown sugar shōchū ====
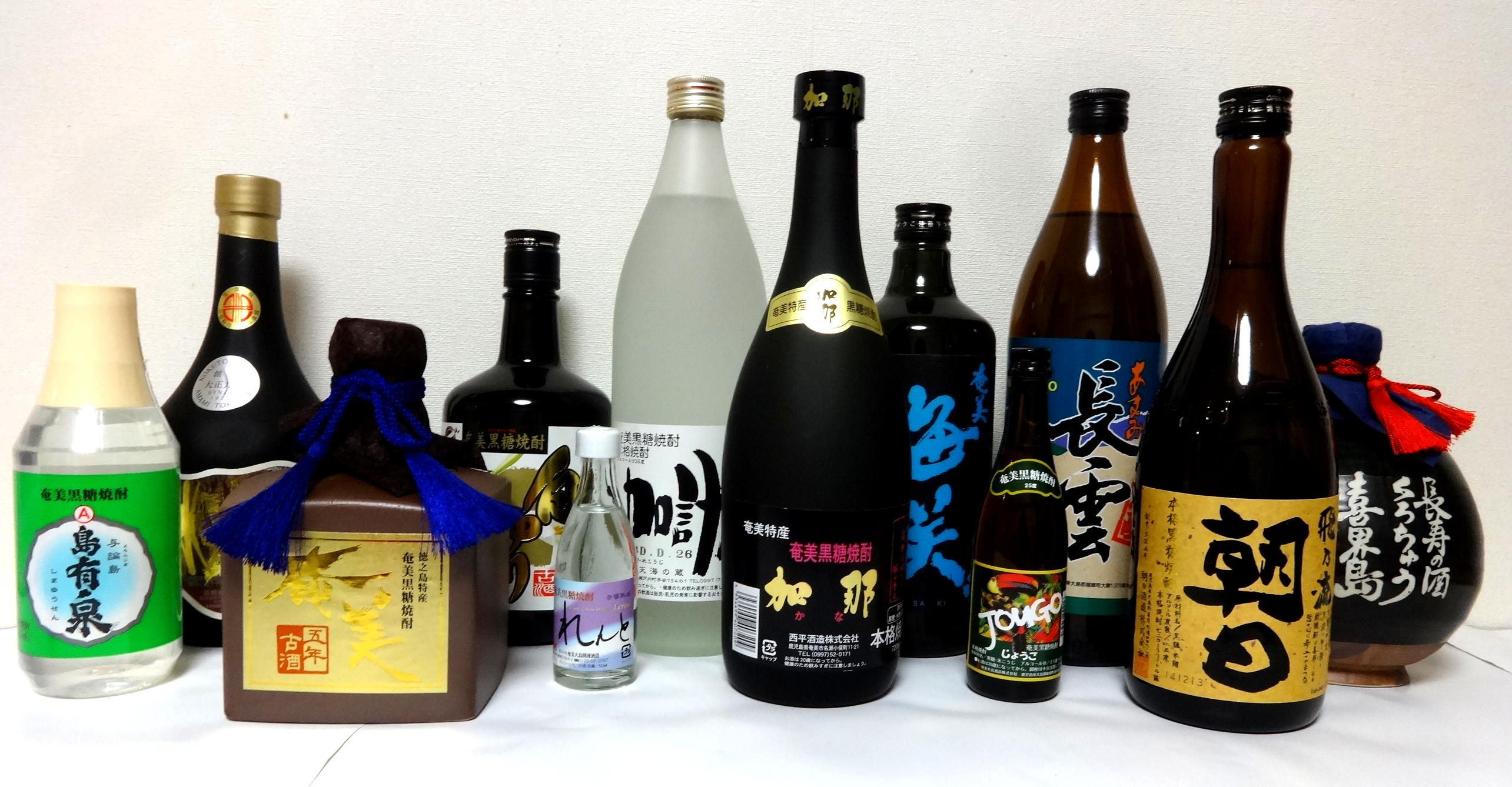
Various bottled Amami kokutō shōchū

From the Edo period through to the time of the Pacific War, the Amami Islands produced drinks such as awamori and a distilled alcohol based on brown sugar. From the middle of the war through to the American occupation, because of a shortage of rice (the base ingredient of awamori) and an inability to export the sugar-based alcohol to the mainland, a large surplus was produced. In 1953, when the Amami Islands were returned to Japanese sovereignty, the alcohol was not classified as "shōchū" under the 1949 alcohol tax law and therefore would attract a high rate of tax. The Ministry of Finance, taking into account the desire of local residents and as part of a strategy to promote the region, gave special recognition to the local alcohol as brown sugar shōchū (黒糖焼酎, kokutō shōchū). This recognition was geographically restricted to the Amami Islands of Kagoshima Prefecture and was conditional on the use of rice kōji. This regional restriction remains in place to this day; as can be seen in the legal definition of singly distilled shōchū above.

Typically, brown sugar shōchū contains 30% or 25% alcohol by volume. Contrary to what might be expected, brown sugar shōchū has a mild and not particularly sweet taste, as it contains no sugar. Nowadays it is produced in 25 breweries in 5 islands: Kikaijima, Amami Ōshima, Tokunoshima, Okinoerabujima and Yoronjima. Awamori, however, is no longer made outside Okinawa Prefecture.

Before the war, another alcoholic drink based on brown sugar was made in the Ogasawara Islands. Its name translates as "sugar alcohol" and could be seen as a form of brown sugar shōchū. Production ceased because of the war, but recently, aiming to revive its popularity, similar alcohol, using no rice kōji, has been introduced. However, as Ogasawara does not qualify for the above special regional exemption, this alcohol is instead classified as rum or spirits.

==== Soba shōchū ====
Soba, or buckwheat, shōchū (そば焼酎, sobajōchū) has origins going back to just 1973 when Unkai Brewery Co., of Gokase, Miyazaki Prefecture, developed it using soba from the local mountainous region as its base ingredient. Since then shōchū producers across Japan have produced it, sometimes as part of a shōchū blend.

The taste is milder than barley shōchū.

==== Awamori ====
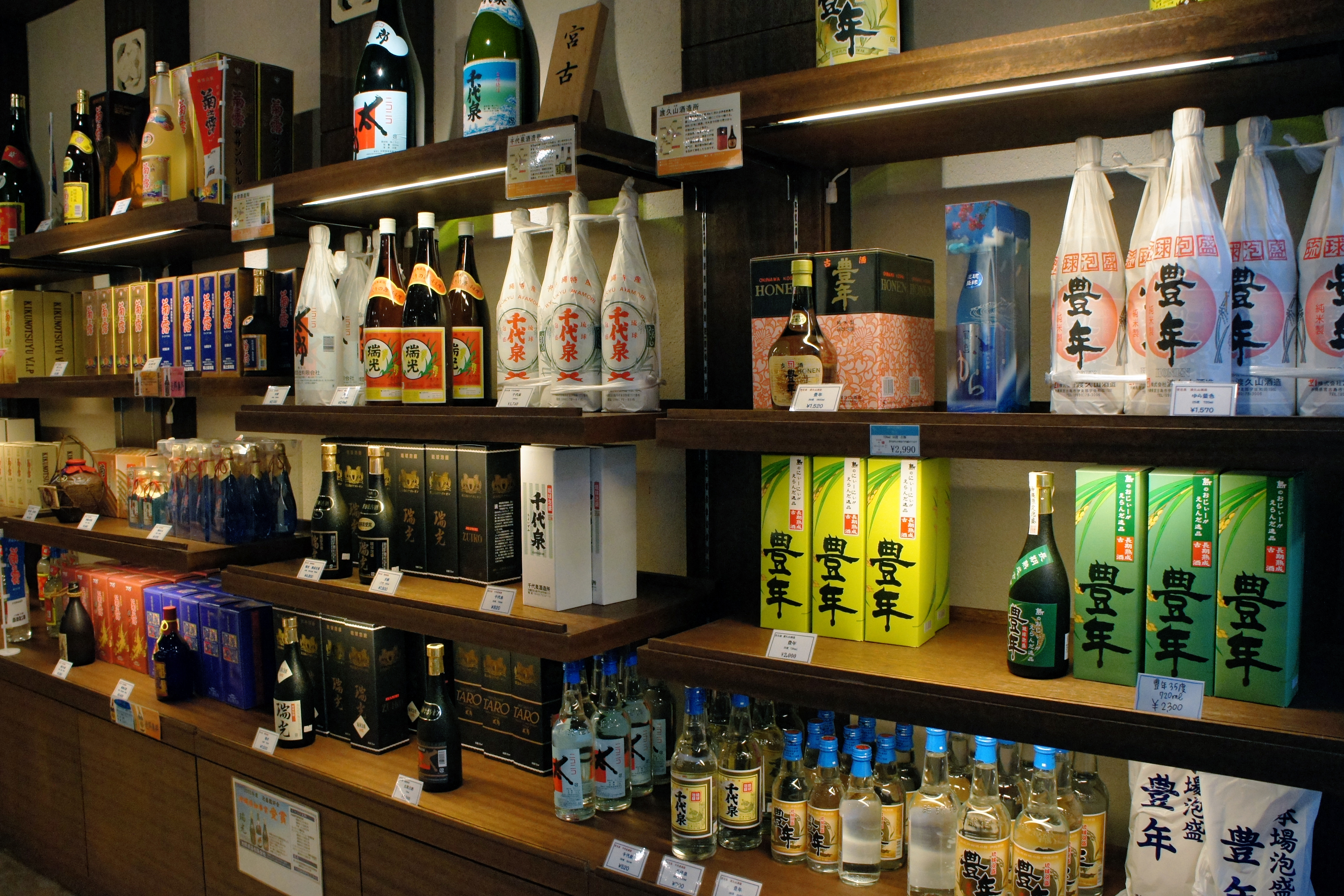
Bottled awamori displayed in a shop

Okinawa is the home of awamori (泡盛, awamori), which uses rice as its base ingredient. Prior to April 1983, it was labeled otsurui shōchū, but is now properly called "Awamori".

Awamori is usually made from Thai long-grained indica rice, not the short-grained japonica of standard shōchū. The fermentation process employs black koji mold indigenous to Okinawa, and secondary fermentation is not performed. Fermentation is done in a way that creates plenty of citric acid, allowing it to be produced all year round despite Okinawa's hot climate. After distillation its strength is reduced with water to about 30% alcohol by volume, although some varieties go as high as 60% (hanazake) .

Japanese law classifies awamori as a singly distilled honkaku shōchū despite the different production processes.

With its method of production, awamori could hypothetically be made anywhere in Japan, but Ryūkyū Awamori (琉球泡盛) is a protected geographical indication restricted to Okinawa.

==== Others ====
Japanese law admits a very wide range of unusual base ingredients, such as perilla leaf, sesame and chestnut, and shōchū made from most if not all of these exists. For example, there is a milk shōchū brand called Makiba-no Yume. Others are generic shōchū mixed with a particular fruit juice or extracts. Such shōchū is typically intended to catch the eye of visitors to a region and has attracted limited broader appeal. Soba shōchū is an example of one that has managed to achieve more success.

== Kasutori shōchū ==
In contrast to moromitori shōchū, kasutori shōchū (粕取り焼酎) is made by distilling the sake lees leftover from the fermentation of sake. It is a form of honkaku shōchū.

It first became popular in the north of Kyūshū, and then spread to other areas, being manufactured during a period when it was not possible to brew refined sake across Japan. It is also widely used in sake production to stop fermentation before it is complete, which can help prevent degradation or give a dry taste. Shōchū made for this purpose is called hashira shōchū (柱焼酎).

During the Edo period shōchū lees were used as a fertilizer during the rice-planting season. Many farms, therefore, installed distillation equipment to distill sake lees to produce shōchū lees. Whilst the lees were used in the fields, the distilled alcohol was drunk, or offered to the gods, at the sanaburi (早苗響) festival held at the end of the rice-planting season to pray for a bountiful harvest. Kasutori shōchū has therefore also come to be known as sanaburi shōchū.

Owing to the recent surge in popularity of shōchū in Japan, an increasing number of manufacturers have been making kasutori shōchū.

Most kasutori shōchū is made in modern ways; shōchū made via older production processes has decreased sharply. People who wish to preserve Japanese culture call shōchū produced the historical way Seichō kasutori shōchū (正調粕取焼酎)—such drinks have been revitalized by their activities.

=== Slang usage ===
Confusingly kasutori is also a slang term for a separate, inferior form of shōchū. After the Pacific War, in a chaotic society with a shortage of good alcohol, moonshine shōchū began to circulate. Its source and ingredients were not apparent, and in extreme cases contained toxic methyl alcohol diluted with water. Such shōchū with ill side-effects became known as kasutori, and the association with poor shōchū lingered, sometimes even affecting the image of "real" respectable kasutori shōchū.

The expressions kasutori literature and kasutori culture also came to be associated with the upheavals of the postwar period.

== Blended shōchū ==
Singly distilled and multiply distilled shōchū can be mixed to form blended shōchū (混和焼酎, konwashōchū). Formerly it was often mislabeled honkaku shōchū, or had no indication of mixing or relative volumes. Starting in 2005 the industry regulated itself and created the blended shōchū mark, with subcategorization based upon the relative volumes used.

Singly distilled shōchū makes up 50%–95% of the total volume of singly distilled blended shōchū. This category is targeted at those viewing pure singly distilled shōchū as having too strong a smell or taste, aiming to be softer and more easily drinkable.

In multiply distilled blended shōchū singly distilled shōchū makes up 5%–50% of the total volume. With a focus on price, this tries to combine the commercial benefits of mass production with multiply distilled shōchū whilst introducing some of the distinctive flavor and aroma of the singly distilled form.

== See also ==
- Awamori—Distilled Okinawan alcoholic drink
- Baijiu—Distilled Chinese alcoholic drink
- Soju—Distilled Korean alcoholic drink
