= Aminopeptidase =

Class of enzymes

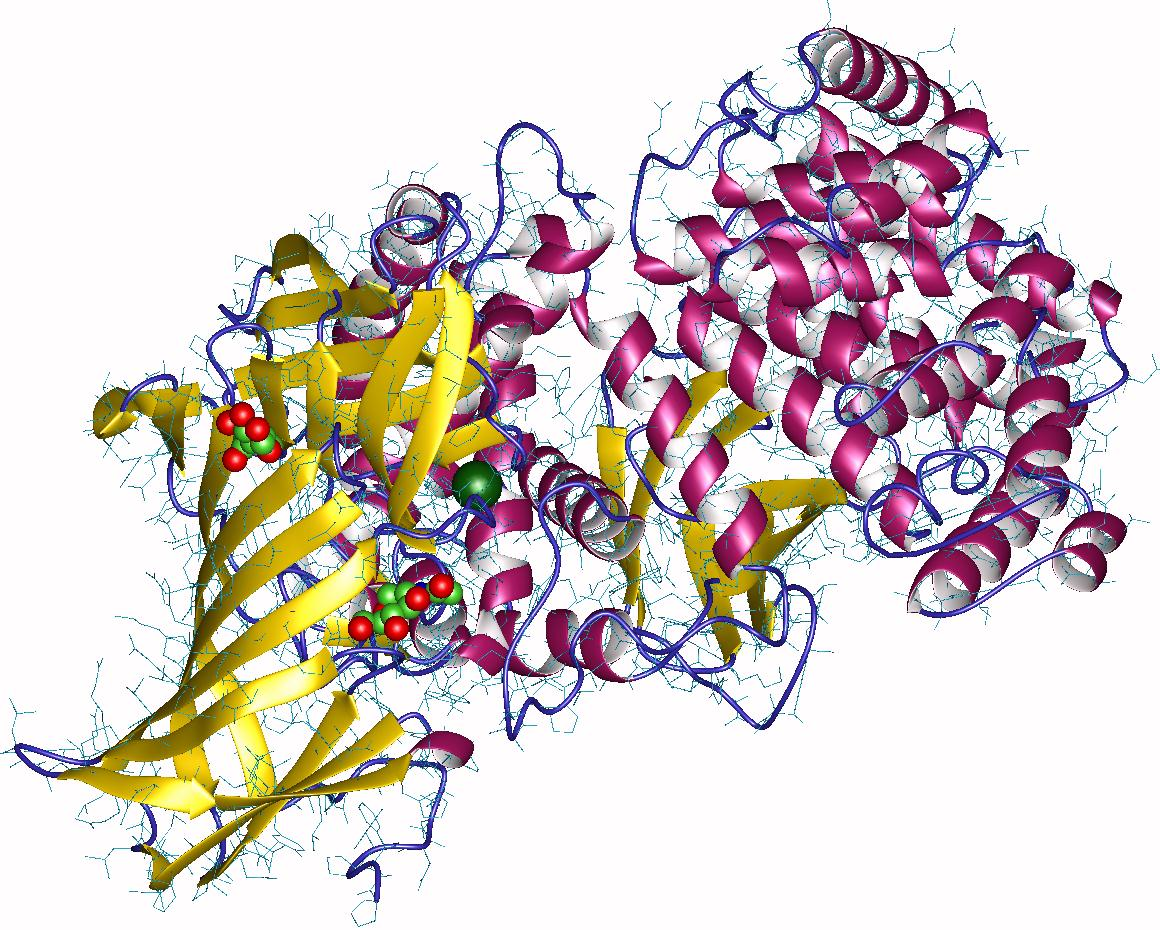
- Crystal structure of the open state of human endoplasmic reticulum aminopeptidase 1 ERAP1

Identifiers
- Symbol: Peptidase_M1
- Pfam: PF01433
- MEROPS: M1
- OPM superfamily: 227
- OPM protein: 3mdj
- CDD: cd09595
- Membranome: 534
Available protein structures:
- PDB: PF01433 (ECOD; PDBsum)
- AlphaFold: PF01433

Aminopeptidases are enzymes that catalyze the cleavage of amino acids from the N-terminus (beginning), of proteins or peptides. They are found in many organisms; in the cell, they are found in many organelles, in the cytosol (internal cellular fluid), and as membrane proteins. Aminopeptidases are used in essential cellular functions, and are often zinc metalloenzymes, containing a zinc cofactor.

Aminopeptidases occur in both water-soluble and membrane-bound forms and can be found both in various cellular compartments and in the extracellular environment (outside of cells). Their broad substrate specificity, their ability to strongly bind to their targets, allows them to remove beginning N-terminal amino acids from almost all unsubstituted oligopeptides. For instance, Aminopeptidase N (AP-N) is particularly abundant in the brush border membranes of the kidney, the small intestine, and the placenta, and is also found in the liver. AP-N is involved in the final digestion of peptides generated from the hydrolysis (cleaving) of proteins by gastric and pancreatic proteases.

Some aminopeptidases are monomeric, and others are found as assemblies of relatively high mass (50 kDa) subunits. cDNA sequences are available for several aminopeptidases and a crystal structure of the open state of human endoplasmic reticulum aminopeptidase 1 is available.

== History ==
The discovery and characterization of aminopeptidases date back to the early 20th century. The term "aminopeptidase" was first introduced in 1929 by Linderstrøm-Lang and Sato in order to describe enzymes that cleave amino acids from the N-terminus of peptides.

In the 1950s and 1960s, the discovery of leucine aminopeptidase (LAP) and aminopeptidase N (APN) marked important milestones in the field. LAP was found to be crucial for protein digestion, while APN was recognized for its role in the regulation of peptide-mediated effects. These discoveries were pivotal in understanding the physiological functions of aminopeptidases and their involvement in health and disease.

The subsequent decades saw extensive research into the structure, function, and mechanisms of action of various aminopeptidases. For example, the M1 family of aminopeptidases, which includes puromycin-sensitive aminopeptidase (PSA), was characterized by conserved zinc-dependent sites and exopeptidase motifs. The study of PSA in different model organisms revealed its essential roles in growth and behavior. Mutations in orthologs of PSA in different species were linked to errors in meiosis and reduced viability of embryos. Aminopeptidase N, also known as AP-N or CD13, was extensively characterized for its broad substrate specificity (ability to bind to its targets) and its presence in various tissues such as the brush border membranes of the kidney, small intestine, and placenta. The enzyme's role in brain function and its identification as the human cluster differentiation antigen CD13 on the surface of myeloid cells further highlighted its biological significance.

== Structure and classification ==
Aminopeptidases are a diverse group of enzymes that play crucial roles in various biological processes, including protein digestion, cell growth, and immune response. They are classified based on their substrate specificity (strength of binding) and catalytic mechanism (means of catalyzing their reaction) into two main categories: metalloaminopeptidases and cysteine aminopeptidases. Metalloaminopeptidases use a metal ion to perform their function, and cysteine aminopeptidases use a particular cysteine amino acid.

The structure of aminopeptidases varies depending on the specific enzyme, but they generally consist of a catalytic domain where the catalysis occurs and additional domains that contribute to target recognition and regulation of their functions. For instance, Aminopeptidase N (APN), a type II metalloprotease, consists of 967 amino acids with a short N-terminal cytoplasmic domain in the cytoplasm, a single transmembrane part reaching through the cellular membrane, and a large cellular ectodomain sticking out of the cell containing the active site.

=== Metalloaminopeptidases ===
Metalloaminopeptidases require metal ions, such as zinc or manganese, in order to function. These enzymes can be identified by a conserved HEXXH motif in their active site. This motif is crucial for the enzyme's function, as the histidine amino acids within the motif coordinate (bind) the metal ion, which then uses hydrolysis to break the peptide bond between the first amino acid and the rest of the protein. Metalloaminopeptidases are the largest and most homogenous class of aminopeptidases; the MEROPS database identifies over 35 families to be part of the MA clan. This classification, which is based on structural similarities and evolutionary relationships, indicates a common ancestral origin for these enzymes. Examples of metalloaminopeptidases include aminopeptidase N (APN), leucine aminopeptidase (LAP), and aminopeptidase A (APA).

=== Cysteine aminopeptidase ===
Cysteine aminopeptidases, on the other hand, rely on a cysteine amino acid to perform catalysis. These enzymes are part of a broader group of cysteine proteases, all of which carve up proteins by using a nucleophilic cysteine thiol along with one or two other catalytic amino acids in a diad or triad. The triad typically consists of cysteine, histidine, and aspartate amino acids, where the cysteine acts as a nucleophile, the histidine acts as a chemical base, and the aspartate stabilizes the histidine. Examples of cysteine aminopeptidases include cathepsin H and aminopeptidase B.

== Biological role ==
In general, aminopeptidases play an important role in the metabolism of both proteins and peptides. Aminopeptidases in the gastrointestinal tract, such as APN and APA, are essential for the digestion of dietary proteins. They facilitate the absorption and utilization of amino acids by cleaving them from the N-terminus of peptides. These enzymes also play a role in the metabolism of bioactive peptides, including hormones and growth factors. By regulating the levels of these peptides, aminopeptidases contribute to homeostasis and physiological process modulation.

=== Bacterial aminopeptidases ===
In bacteria, aminopeptidases are produced by both facultative anaerobic strains, which can respire with or without oxygen, and obligate strains, which either require or are killed by atmospheric oxygen. They and can be found in many different cellular locations, for example in the cytoplasm, in membranes, associated with the cell envelope, or secreted into the extracellular medium. These enzymes are involved in the breaking down of externally supplied peptides (very short proteins) and are necessary for the final steps of protein turnover and replacement. They also participate in specific functions like the cleavage of N-terminal (beginning) methionine from newly synthesized peptide chains (methionine aminopeptidases), stabilization of ColE1-based multicopy plasmids (e.g. aminopeptidase A), and the cleavage of N-terminal pyroglutamate (e.g. pyroglutamyl aminopeptidase.

=== Fungal aminopeptidases ===
Fungi, particularly species like Aspergillus oryzae and Aspergillus sojae, produce aminopeptidases that have applications in the food industry as debittering agents. These enzymes are also of interest for their potential biotechnological applications. For example, leucine aminopeptidase (LAP) from Aspergillus species has been found to be thermostable and could theoretically be used to control the degree of hydrolysis and flavor development in a wide range of substances.

=== Mammalian aminopeptidases ===
In mammals, aminopeptidases are produced in various tissues and organs, such as the liver, kidney, and intestine. Due to their ability to break down proteins and peptides, they are used in to help digest proteins, regulate peptide-mediated effects, and break down bioactive peptides. Aminopeptidase N (AP-N) is particularly abundant in the brush border membranes of the kidney, small intestine, and placenta, and is also rich in the liver. It has a broad substrate specificity (ability to bind to its targets) and is involved in the final stages of the digestion of peptides generated from breaking-up and hydrolysis of proteins by gastric and pancreatic proteases.

== Medicine and biotechnology ==
Aminopeptidase has been studied for use in treating hypertension, inflammation, and some cancers. Aminopeptidase A (APA) is implicated in blood pressure regulation by converting angiotensin II to angiotensin III. APA inhibitors are being explored as potential antihypertensive agents, offering a novel approach to managing hypertension. Aminopeptidase N (APN) has been associated with the pathogenesis of inflammatory diseases such as rheumatoid arthritis and inflammatory bowel disease. Inhibitors of APN have demonstrated anti-inflammatory effects in animal models, positioning them as potential therapeutic agents for these conditions. Several aminopeptidases, including APN, APA, and leucine aminopeptidase (LAP), are overexpressed in various cancers. Their involvement in tumor growth, invasion, and angiogenesis makes them attractive targets for cancer therapy. Aminopeptidase inhibitors have shown promise in preclinical studies as potential anticancer agents.

=== Diagnostic markers ===
The activity and expression levels of aminopeptidases have been explored as diagnostic markers for diseases like liver disorders and cancer. Variations in these parameters can indicate pathological conditions, aiding in disease diagnosis and monitoring.

=== Biosensors ===
Aminopeptidases have been utilized in creating biosensors for detecting specific amino acids or peptides. These biosensors generate a measurable signal in the presence of the target analyte, leveraging the catalytic activity of aminopeptidases.

=== Protein sequencing ===
In protein sequencing, aminopeptidases are employed in the Edman degradation method. This technique involves the sequential removal and identification of the N-terminal amino acid of proteins, facilitating the elucidation of their amino acid sequence.

== Food industry ==
In the food industry, aminopeptidases from Aspergillus oryzae and Aspergillus sojae are utilized for debittering protein hydrolysates, including those used in soy sauce and miso production. These enzymes help remove bitter-tasting peptides, enhancing the flavor and palatability of these products. Aminopeptidases also play a crucial role in cheese ripening by participating in the proteolysis of milk proteins. This enzymatic action contributes significantly to the development of the cheese's flavor and texture, making aminopeptidases essential in the cheese-making process.

When aminopeptidases are used in food processing, it is crucial to ensure that they are food-grade and safe for consumption. Aminopeptidases from A. oryzae and A. sojae, for example, have been extensively studied and are considered safe for use in food applications. It is important to handle these enzymes under conditions that prevent contamination and degradation, which could affect both the safety and quality of the food products.

Aminopeptidases require specific storage conditions to maintain their stability and enzymatic activity. For instance, human aminopeptidase A is stable at a pH range of 7.0–8.5 and can be stored at −20 °C for several months without significant loss of activity. Similarly, a halotolerant intracellular protease from Bacillus subtilis strain FP-133, which exhibits aminopeptidase activity, retains full activity after being stored in 7.5% (w/v) NaCl at 4 °C for 24 hours. These examples indicate that aminopeptidases generally require neutral pH conditions and can be stored at low temperatures, such as −20 °C or −80 °C, for extended periods to preserve their activity.

== See also ==
- Alanine aminopeptidase
- Carboxypeptidase
