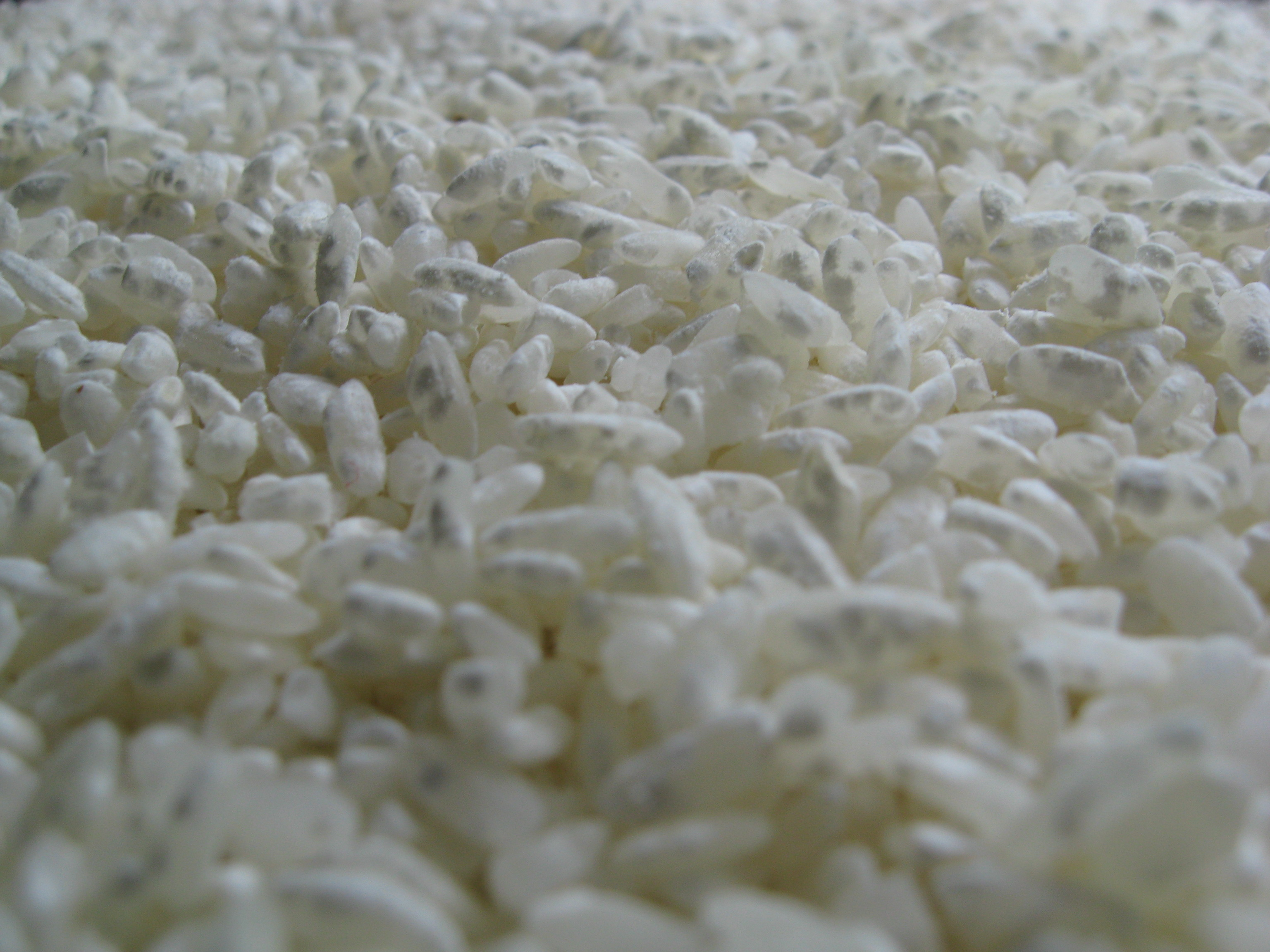
- Aspergillus oryzae growing on rice to make koji

Scientific classification
- Kingdom: Fungi
- Division: Ascomycota
- Class: Eurotiomycetes
- Order: Eurotiales
- Family: Aspergillaceae
- Genus: Aspergillus
- Species: A. oryzae

Binomial name
- Aspergillus oryzae (Ahlburg) E. Cohn

= Aspergillus oryzae =

Filamentous fungus

Aspergillus oryzae, also known as kōji mold (Japanese: ニホンコウジカビ (日本麹黴), Hepburn: nihon kōji kabi), is a mold used in East Asia to saccharify rice, sweet potato, and barley in the making of alcoholic beverages such as sake and shōchū, and also to ferment soybeans for making soy sauce and miso. It is one of the different koji molds used for food fermentation.

However, in the production of fermented foods of soybeans such as soy sauce and miso, Aspergillus sojae is sometimes used instead of A. oryzae. A. oryzae is also used for the production of rice vinegars. Barley kōji (麦麹) or rice kōji (米麹) are made by fermenting the grains with A. oryzae hyphae.

The technique of solid-state cultivation using rice grains, soybeans, and wheat bran to propagate fungi for use in fermented foods is thought to have originated in China. However, there are two scholarly theories regarding the country that first employed A. oryzae in the production of fermented foods: one suggests it was China, while the other proposes it was Japan. Genomic analysis has led some scholars to believe that the Japanese domesticated the Aspergillus flavus that had mutated and ceased to produce toxic aflatoxins, giving rise to A. oryzae. While the two fungi share the same cluster of genes that encode for aflatoxin synthesis, this gene cluster is non-functional in A. oryzae. Eiji Ichishima of Tohoku University called the kōji fungus a "national fungus" (kokkin) in the journal of the Brewing Society of Japan, because of its importance not only for making the kōji for sake brewing, but also for making the kōji for miso, soy sauce, and a range of other traditional Japanese foods. His proposal was approved at the society's annual meeting in 2006.

The Japanese word kōji (麹) is used in several meanings, and in some cases it specifically refers to A. oryzae and A. sojae, while in other cases it refers to all molds used in fermented foods, including Monascus purpureus and other molds, so care should be taken to avoid confusion.

== Uses and functional properties in fermented foods ==
=== Sake brewing ===
Aspergillus oryzae is currently widely used in the production of fermented foods throughout East Asia. Historically, however, traditional methods of alcohol brewing varied significantly. In Japan, A. oryzae was cultivated on steamed and loosened rice for brewing purposes. In contrast, in countries such as China, the Philippines, Korea, and Thailand, it was more common to use fungi from the genera Rhizopus and Mucor, which were cultivated on a brick-like mass formed by mixing ground grains with water and kneading the mixture into a solid shape.

This difference in fermentation methods is rooted in dietary traditions. In northern China, there was a long-established custom of making a paste by combining flour from wheat or millet with water for daily consumption. This practice was adapted for fermented food production and eventually spread to other regions. In contrast, such a dietary habit did not take root in Japan for a long time, where the staple food remained cooked (steamed) rice. As a result, a uniquely complex method of sake brewing developed in Japan, relying exclusively on Aspergillus oryzae.

The following properties of A. oryzae strains are important in rice saccharification for sake brewing:

- Growth: rapid mycelial growth on and into the rice kernels
- Enzymes: strong secretion of amylases (α-amylase and glucoamylase); some carboxypeptidase; low tyrosinase
- Aesthetics: pleasant fragrance; accumulation of flavoring compounds
- Color: low production of deferriferrichrome (a siderophore), flavins, and other colored substances

=== Soy sauce and miso production ===
Two of the key enzyme groups secreted by A. oryzae are pectinase and peptidase. Pectinase drives starch hydrolysis by breaking down the pectin in the cell walls of plant materials like soybeans, in the case of miso and soy sauce production, while peptidases like leucine aminopeptidase cleave amino acids from proteins and polypeptides like glutamic acid, an amino acid that contributes to the characteristic umami flavor of these fermented soybean products.

A. oryzae secretes many salt-tolerant alkaline proteases which makes it particularly stable in the high-sodium conditions required for the production of miso and soy sauce. The strain A. oryzae RIB40, for example, appears to have specific salt tolerance genes that regulate K^{+} transport.

== Varieties used for shōchū making ==
Three varieties of kōji mold are used for making shōchū, each with distinct characteristics.

Genichirō Kawachi (1883 -1948), who is said to be the father of modern shōchū and Tamaki Inui (1873 -1946), a lecturer at University of Tokyo succeeded in the first isolation and culturing of aspergillus species such as A. kawachii, A. awamori, and a variety of subtaxa of A. oryzae, which led to great progress in producing shōchū in Japan. Since then, aspergillus developed by Kawachi has also been used for soju and makgeolli in Korea.

- Yellow kōji (A. oryzae) is used to produce sake, and at one time all honkaku shōchū. However, yellow kōji is extremely sensitive to temperature; its moromi can easily sour during fermentation. This makes it difficult to use in warmer regions such as Kyūshū, and gradually black and white kōji became more common in production of shōchū. Its strength is that it gives rise to a rich, fruity, refreshing taste, so despite the difficulties and great skill required, it is still used by some manufacturers. It is popular amongst young people who previously had no interest in typically strong potato shōchū, playing a role in its recent revival. Thus, white and black kōji are mainly used in the production of shōchū, but only yellow kōji (A. oryzae) is usually used in the production of sake.
- White kōji (A. kawachii) was discovered as a mutation from black kōji by Genichirō Kawachi in 1918. This effect was researched and white kōji was successfully grown independently. White kōji is easy to cultivate and its enzymes promote rapid saccharization; as a result, it is used to produce most shōchū today. It gives rise to a drink with a refreshing, mild, sweet taste.
- Black kōji (A. luchuensis) is mainly used to produce shōchū and awamori. In 1901, Tamaki Inui, lecturer at University of Tokyo succeeded in the first isolating and culturing. In 1910, Genichirō Kawachi succeeded for the first time in culturing var. kawachi, a variety of subtaxa of A. awamori. This improved the efficiency of shōchū production. It produces plenty of citric acid which helps to prevent the souring of the moromi. Of all three kōji, it most effectively extracts the taste and character of the base ingredients, giving its shōchū a rich aroma with a slightly sweet, mellow taste. Its spores disperse easily, covering production facilities and workers' clothes in a layer of black. Such issues led to it falling out of favour, but due to the development of new kuro-kōji (NK-kōji) in the mid-1980s, interest in black kōji resurged amongst honkaku shōchū makers because of the depth and quality of the taste it produced. Several popular brands now explicitly state they use black kōji on their labels.

== Genome ==
Initially kept secret, the A. oryzae genome was released by a consortium of Japanese biotechnology companies in late 2005. The eight chromosomes together comprise 37 million base pairs and 12 thousand predicted genes. The genome of A. oryzae is thus one-third larger than that of two related Aspergillus species, the genetics model organism A. nidulans and the potentially dangerous A. fumigatus. Many of the extra genes present in A. oryzae are predicted to be involved in secondary metabolism. The sequenced strain isolated in 1950 is called RIB40 or ATCC 42149; its morphology, growth, and enzyme production are typical of strains used for sake brewing.

The increased number of genes in Aspergillus oryzae are responsible for the function of proteins and cellular processes such as hydrolase, transporters, and metabolism. The extensive array of secretory hydrolase and transporters allows the mold to break down or secrete various compounds effectively. Typically, when A. oryzae exposed to high concentrations of foods like rice, soybean, wheat, etc. during fermentation, its growth may be negatively affected. However, over time this may potentially allow the kōji to gain new transporters due to the environment's conditions.

Although A. oryzae is closely related A. flavus and A. parasiticus, which are known to secrete toxins called aflatoxins that cause severe food poisoning, the kōji mold has not been found to produce those toxins. Furthermore, no carcinogenic substances have been discovered in the mold. A study has shown that even when A. oryzae is put under conditions favorable to express and secrete aflatoxin, the aflatoxin genes in A. oryzae were not expressed.

== Use in biotechnology ==
Trans-resveratrol can be efficiently cleaved from its glucoside piceid through the process of fermentation by A. oryzae. "Flavourzyme", a protease blend derived from A. oryzae, is used to produce enzyme-hydrolyzed vegetable protein.

A. oryzae is hard to study due to difficulties in conventional genetic manipulation. This is because A. oryzae have cell walls that are difficult to break down which makes gene insertion/editing complicated. However, scientists have recently started utilizing CRISPR/Cas9 in A. oryzae. This increased mutation rates in the genome which was not possible in the past since the mold only reproduced asexually.

=== Secondary metabolites ===
A. oryzae is a good choice as a secondary metabolite factory because of its relatively few endogenous secondary metabolites. Transformed types can produce: polyketide synthase-derived 1,3,6,8-tetrahydroxynaphthalene, alternapyrone, and 3-methylorcinaldehyde; citrinin; terrequinone A; tennelin, pyripyropene, aphidicolin, terretonin, and andrastin A by plasmid insertion; paxilline and aflatrem by co-transformation; and aspyridone, originally from A. nidulans, by Gateway cloning.

== Gallery ==
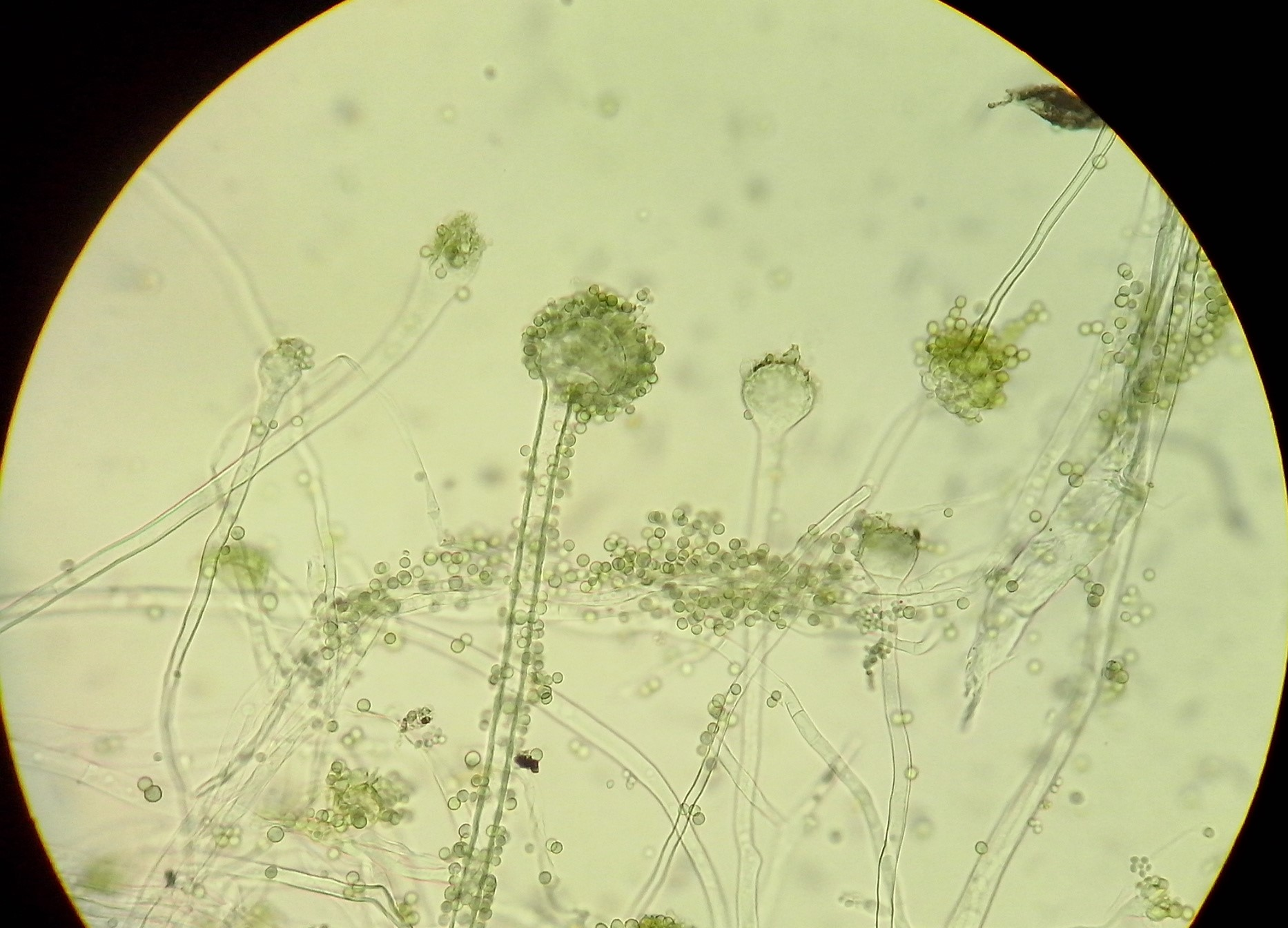
Conidiophores with conidia of the microscopic fungus A. oryzae under light microscope

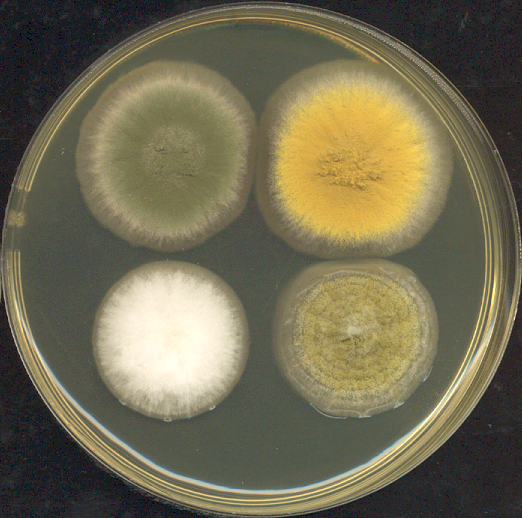
Four Aspergillus colonies grown at 37 °C (99 °F) for three days on rich media. The bottom two are A. oryzae strains.

== See also ==
- Qū
- Akira Endo
- Aspergillus sojae
- Kōji (food) § History
- Lactase
- Medicinal molds
- Rhizopus oligosporus
