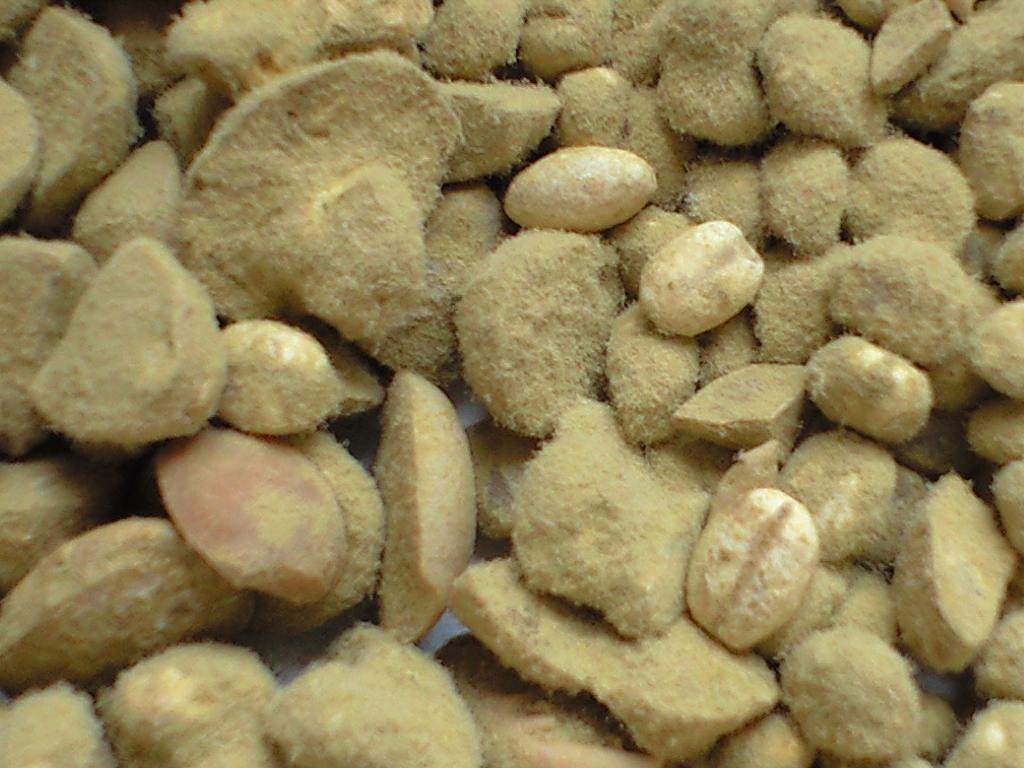
- Soy sauce koji consisting of soy bean and wheat cultured with Aspergillus sojae

Scientific classification
- Kingdom: Fungi
- Division: Ascomycota
- Class: Eurotiomycetes
- Order: Eurotiales
- Family: Aspergillaceae
- Genus: Aspergillus
- Species: A. sojae

Binomial name
- Aspergillus sojae Sakag. et K.Yamada ex Murak. 1971

Varieties
- Aspergillus sojae var. gymnosardae

Synonyms
- Aspergillus sojae Sakag. & K. Yamada 1944; Aspergillus parasiticus f. sojae (Sakag. & K. Yamada) Nehira 1957; Aspergillus parasiticus var. sojae (Sakag. & K. Yamada) Wicklow 1983; Aspergillus flavus var. sojae (Sakag. & K. Yamada ex Murak.)

= Aspergillus sojae =

Species of fungus

Aspergillus sojae is a species of fungus in the genus Aspergillus.

In Japan, it is used to make the ferment (kōji) of soy sauce, miso, mirin, and other lacto-fermented condiments such as tsukemono. Soy sauce condiment is produced by fermenting soybeans with A. sojae, along with water and salt.

Glyceollins, molecules belonging to the pterocarpans, are found in the soybean (Glycine max) and have been found to have an antifungal activity against A. sojae.

Aspergillus sojae contains 10 glutaminase genes. The glutaminase enzyme in A. sojae is important for the taste of the soy sauce that it produces.

An experiment was conducted using the genome sequencing of A. sojae. Strain NBRC 4239 had been isolated from the koji used to prepare certain Japanese soy sauces. The sequencing technology was used to investigate the genome with respect to enzymes and secondary metabolites in comparison with other Aspergillus species sequenced. The A. sojae NBRC4239 genome data will be useful to characterize functional features of the koji molds used in Japanese industries.

== See also ==
- Akira Endo
- Aspergillus oryzae
- Medicinal molds
- Rhizopus oligosporus
