= Oriental Brewery =

South Korean brewery

Oriental Brewery Co., Ltd.
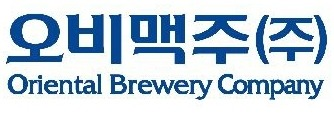

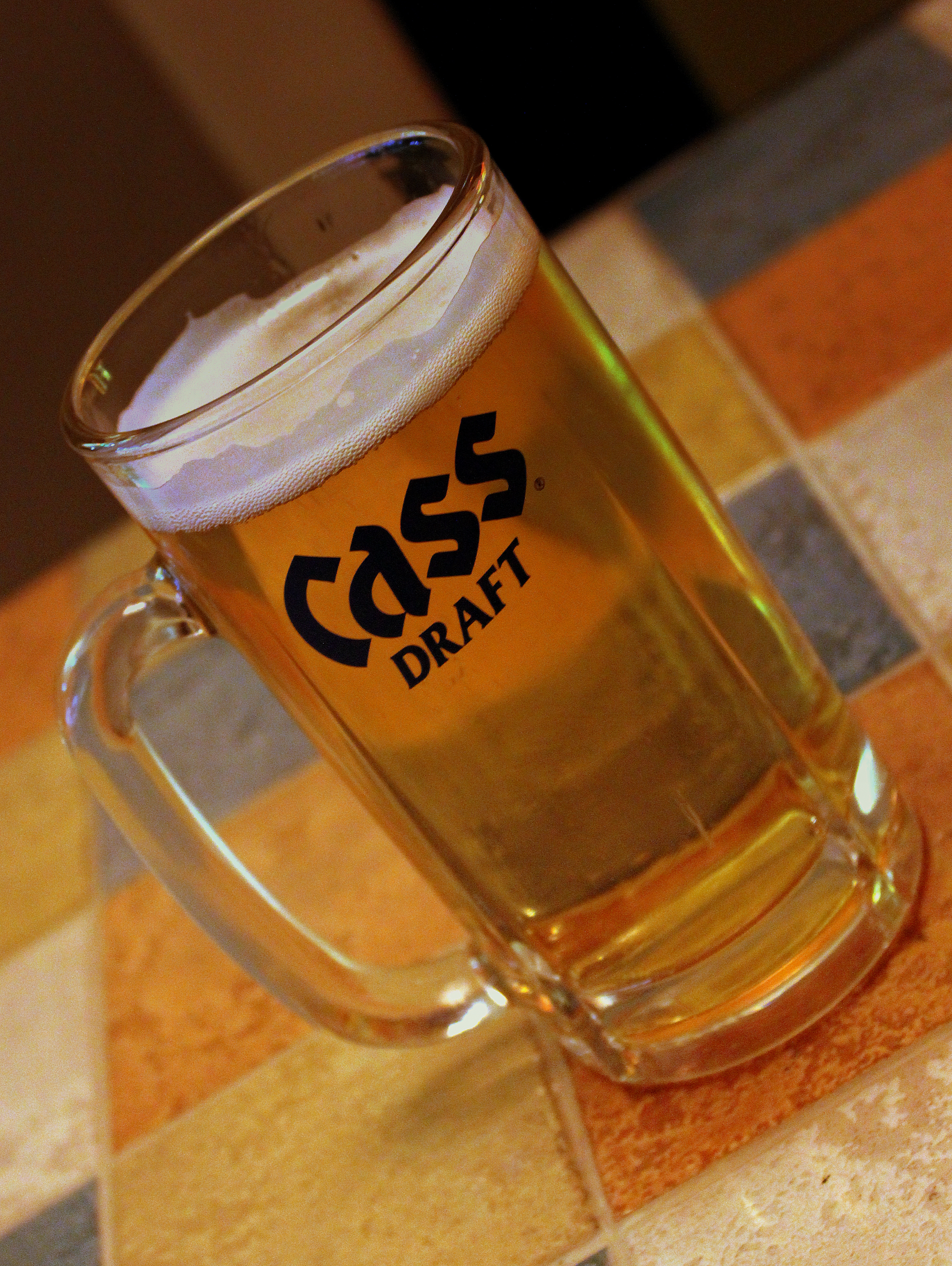
- Cass beer, one of Oriental Brewery's leading products
- Native name: 오비맥주
- Type: joint-stock company
- Industry: Drink industry
- Founded: 18 December 1933; 92 years ago
- Headquarters: Seoul, South Korea
- Area served: Worldwide
- Products: Alcoholic beverages: beer and soft drinks
- Revenue: 1,542,126,174,946 Won (2019)
- Operating income: 408,959,810,553 Won (2019)
- Net income: 274,319,564,612 (2019)
- Total assets: 3,091,787,640,376 Won (2019)
- Number of employees: 1,994 (2019)
- Parent: AB InBev
- Website: www.ob.co.kr

Oriental Brewery or OB (Korean: 오비맥주; lit. 'OB Beer') is a South Korean brewery currently owned by AB InBev, and initially founded by Doosan Group.

== History ==
In 1933, Showa Kirin Brewery (Kirin Company) established Oriental Brewery. Oriental Brewery was privatized in 1952. Established by the Doosan Group in 1952, it was purchased by InBev in 1998. In July 2009, it was sold by Anheuser-Busch InBev as the parent company sought to reduce its debt. It was sold to an affiliate of Kohlberg Kravis Roberts & Co.. Anheuser-Busch InBev (AB Inbev) has retained the right to purchase OB five years from its sale, at predetermined financial terms. In April 2014, AB Inbev executed its right to repurchase OB. OB became a subsidiary of AB Inbev again. Today OB produces several of Korea's most popular beverages including the OB, Cass and Cafri lager brands. In March 2001, the company merged Cass Beer (State) with the production capacity of 1,120,000 KLE per year, and produced red rock, OBE, KaprI, Budweiser, etc. In July 2002, it was the first beer industry to obtain the ISO 9001 certification from the Korea Standards Association.

== Brands ==
=== OB Golden Lager ===
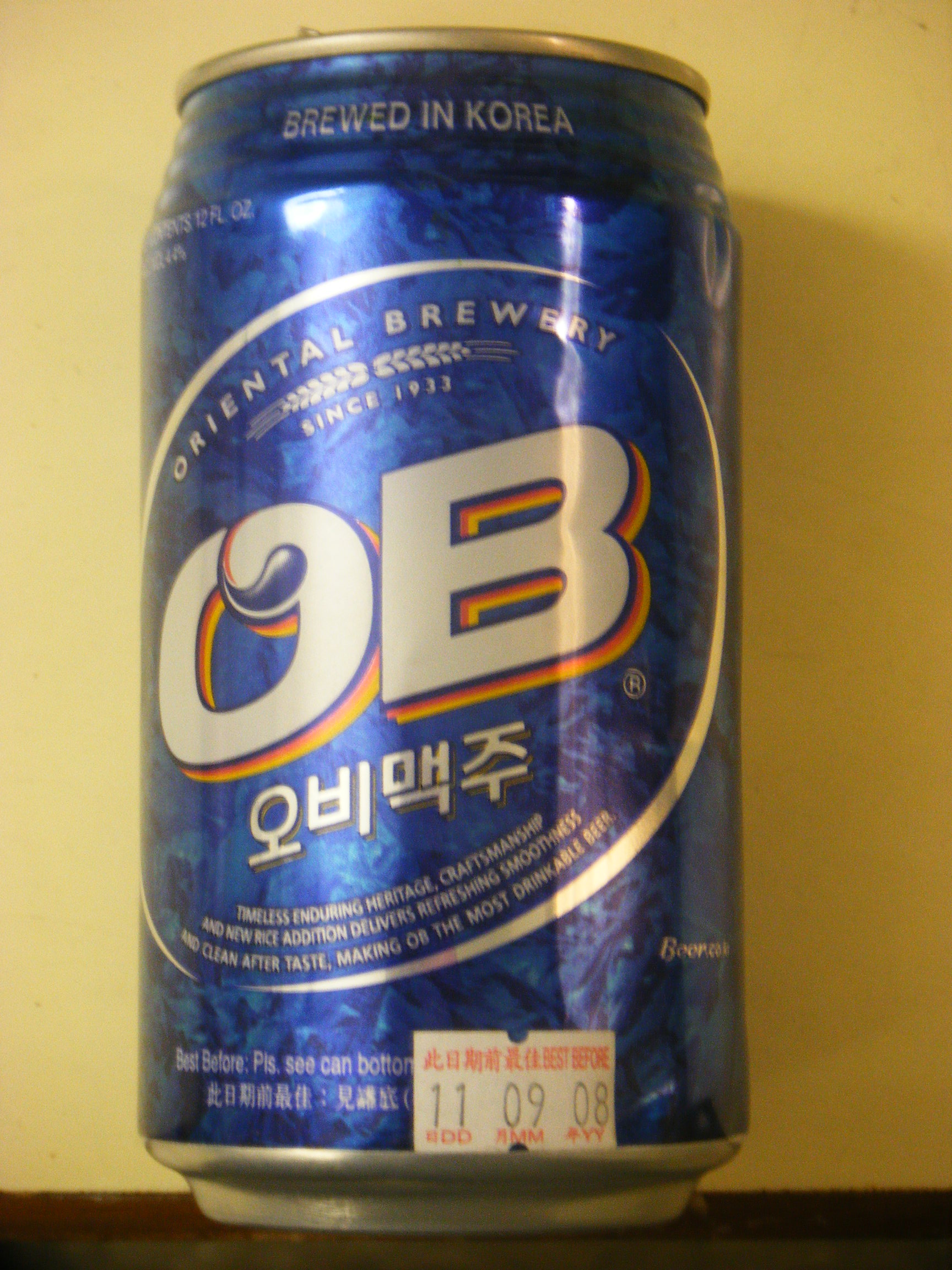
OB Lager

The 4th top selling beer in Korea. OB Lager is a pale, 4.4% A.B.V. pale lager available in cans and bottles, and served on draft in Korea. Originally brewed in 1948; the name was changed from OB Lager simply to OB in 2003; the recipe was altered to include rice. The name changed to OB Blue in June 2006 with another slight recipe tweak.

=== OB Premier Weizen ===
German Hefeweizen style.

=== Cass Fresh Cold Brewed ===
A pale-golden pale lager with a 4.5% ABV. Originally brewed by the Cass Brewery, the brand had been taken over by Jinro-Coors, one of the country's leading brewers. After having around 70% of the Korean lager market in the 1980s, by 1994 Cass had fallen behind Hite as Korea's top selling lager. Oriental Brewery bought the Cass brand from Jinro-Coors in 1999 and built it up again, with OB declaring a 51% market share in 2000. In 2007, the higher alcohol Cass Red was introduced. In 2011 Cass Lager became South Korea's number one selling brand, overtaking Hite.

The beer became notable after an endorsement by British celebrity chef Gordon Ramsay who described it as "not pretentious", "easy" and "fresh"; citing it as his preferred beverage with Korean dishes since acquiring a taste for the cuisine 15 years ago. His appearance in several of the beer's adverts caused much derision from viewers who found Ramsay's preference for the beer — which was considered to be poor in quality — offending despite his status as a chef very scrutinizing of his food palate.

Non-alcoholic look-alikes of Cass can be found with brand names such as "Cars" and "Cdss". Some noraebang (singing rooms) establishments have been known to try to pass off these imitations as the real thing, as Korean law prohibits noraebang marked as such from selling alcoholic drinks within its premises (noraejujeom establishments are allowed to sell alcohol).

=== Cass Light ===
Cass Light is a low-carb pale lager with 4.0% ABV.

=== Cass Ice Light ===
Pale lager style.

=== Cass Red ===
A pale lager with 6.9% ABV, this lager contains higher amount of alcohol.

=== Cass Lemon ===
Radler containing natural lemon juice. ABV 3.9%.

=== Cass 0.0 ===
Non-alcoholic beer of OB beer.

=== Cafri ===
Cafri (ABV 4.2%) is an American light lager. It is widely available in clear 330 ml (11.2 U.S. fl oz; 11.6 imp fl oz) long-neck bottles but falls behind OB, Cass and Hite in popularity.

=== Aleston Black Ale ===
Porter style.

=== Aleston Brown Ale ===
British style beer. Brewed with noble hops & pale malt.

=== Blue Girl (4.5%) ===
Alcoholic Contents: 4.5% alc./vol (China). There is also a 5% version which is produced for sale in Hong Kong, Macau and Taiwan and which is listed separately.

=== Blue Girl (5.0%) ===
This is the 5%-Version, sold in HongKong, Macao and Taiwan only. Brewed by/for Jebsen Beer.

=== Blue Girl Draft ===
Retired from the market. Jebsen Beer and formerly brewed at Oriental Brewery (AB-InBev).

=== Dester ===
Pale Lager.

=== Dester Gold (100% Malt) ===
Dester beer brewed with 100% Malt. At the moment only exported to Malaysia and Singapore.

=== Essential Beer ===
Pale lager style.

=== Guam USA Beer Company Island Lager ===
Guam USA Beer Company Island Lager. Pale lager stye.

=== Red Rock ===
Non pasteurized fresh premium red beer. Amber Lager/Vienna Style.

=== Sonderberg ===
Pilsner lager beer. Pale lager style.

=== Suntory The Premium Malt ===
A deep pilsener beer (ABV 5.5). Original from Suntory Holdings Limited.

== Global Brands ==
=== Budweiser ===
Budweiser is an American-style pale lager produced by American brewer Anheuser-Busch, which is a part of multinational corporation Anheuser–Busch InBev.

Introduced in 1876 by Carl Conrad & Co. of St. Louis, Missouri, it has grown to become one of the highest selling beers in the United States, and is available in over 80 markets worldwide—though, due to a trademark dispute, does not necessarily do so under the Budweiser name. It is made with up to 30% rice in addition to hops and barley malt. Produced in various breweries around the world, Budweiser is a filtered beer available in draft and packaged forms.

=== Bud Ice ===
Introduced in 1994 as "Ice by Budweiser", it has more alcohol (5.5% ABV) than Budweiser. It is best known for an advertising campaign that involved a malevolent penguin that stalked Bud Ice drinkers and stole their beer, announcing its presence by singing the "doo-be-doo-be-doo" phrase from "Strangers in the Night".

=== Hoegaarden ===
Hoegaarden Brewery is a brewery in Hoegaarden, Belgium, and the producer of a well-known wheat beer.

=== Beck's ===
Beck's Brewery, also known as Brauerei Beck & Co., is a brewery in the northern German city of Bremen. In 2001 Interbrew agreed to buy Brauerei Beck for 1.8 billion euro; at that time it was the fourth largest brewer in Germany. Since 2008 it has been part of Anheuser-Busch InBev. US manufacture of Beck's Brew has been based in St. Louis, Missouri since early 2012 but some customers have rebelled against the US market version.

=== Stella Artois ===
Stella Artois is a Belgian pilsner lager of between 4.8 and 5.2% ABV which was first brewed by Brouwerij Artois (the Artois Brewery) in Leuven, Belgium, in 1926. Since 2008, a 4% ABV version is sold in Britain, Ireland, Canada and New Zealand. Through a series of mergers, Stella Artois is now ordinarily produced by Anheuser-Busch InBev, the world's largest brewer.

=== Leffe ===
Leffe is a premium beer brand owned by InBev Belgium, the European operating arm of the global Anheuser–Busch InBev brewery giant. There are several beers in the range, and they are marketed as Abbey beers. They are brewed in large quantities and are widely distributed.

=== Löwenbräu ===
Löwenbräu is a brewery in Munich owned by Anheuser-Busch InBev. Its name means "lion's brew" in German. Most Löwenbräu beers are marketed as being brewed according to the Reinheitsgebot, the Bavarian beer purity regulation of 1516.

=== Corona ===
Corona Extra is a pale lager produced by Cervecería Modelo in Mexico for domestic distribution and export to all other countries besides the United States, and by Constellation Brands in Mexico for export to the United States. The split ownership is a result of an anti-trust settlement permitting the merger of Grupo Modelo with AB InBev.

The Corona brand is one of the top-selling beers worldwide. Outside Mexico, Corona is commonly served with a wedge of lime or lemon in the neck of the bottle to add tartness and flavor.

In the United States, Corona Extra is the top selling imported beer.

=== The Hand Malt Beer ===
Belgian Wit

Belgian Wit is Belgian-Style white ale.

5.0 ABV/ IBU 9

Slow IPA

Slow IPA is a low alcohol India pale ale. It has special favors and aromas. The color of beer is like Corona or Pilsner beer.

4.6 ABV/IBU 40

Mocha Stout

Mocha Stout has coffee flavor beer. It contains chocolate stout with a creamy head.

5.0 ABV / IBU 28

Extra Special Ale

Extra Special Ale is English style beer. The color of beer is strong orange.

5.7 ABV / IBU 23

Belgian Dubbel

Belgian Dubbel is made by Korean Yeot (it can be called Candy).

7.2 ABV / IBU 21

== See also ==
- Korean beer
- Korean cuisine
