= Sohn Hye-won =

South Korean politician (born 1955)

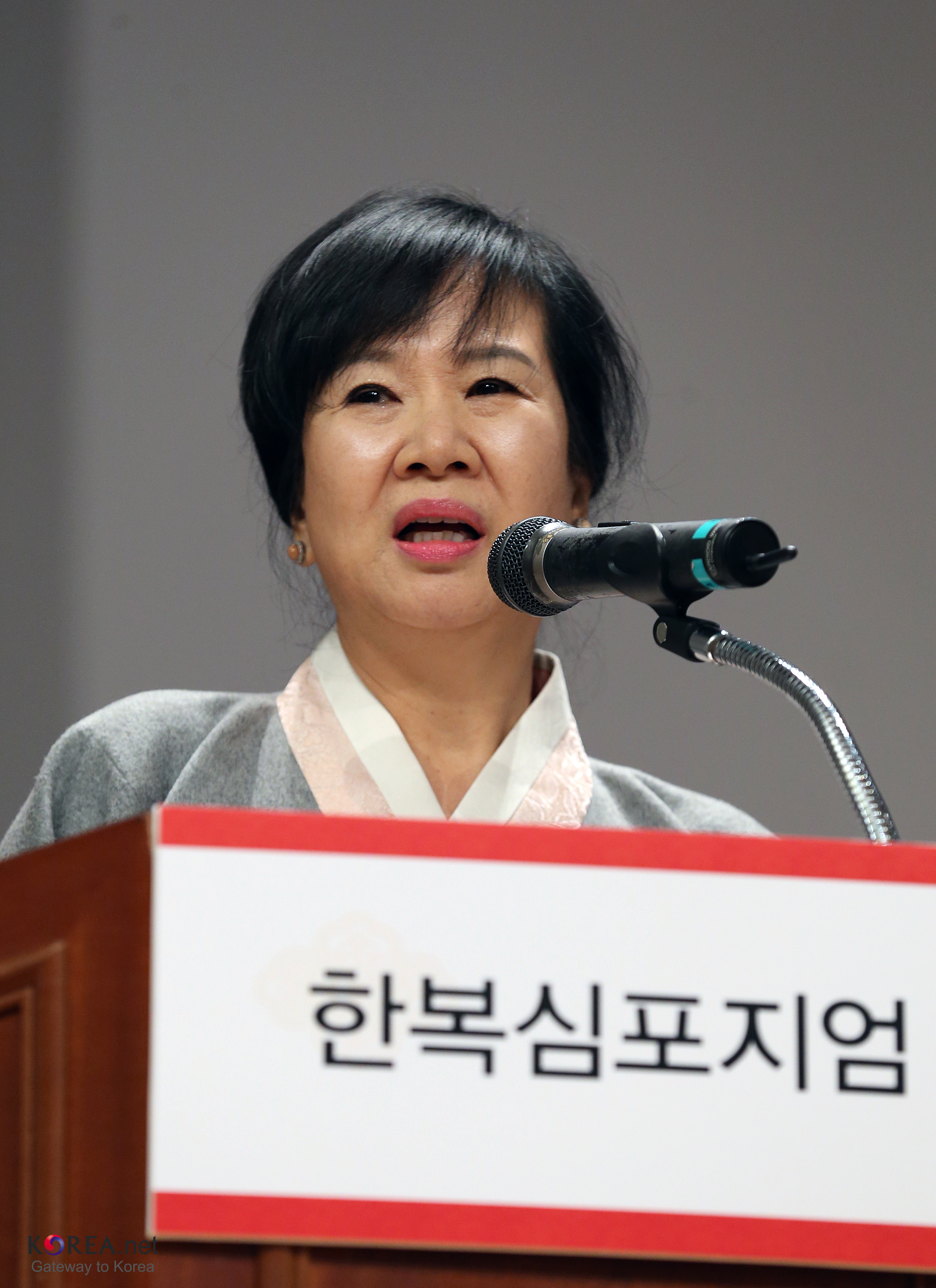

Korean name
- Hangul: 손혜원
- RR: Son Hyewon
- MR: Son Hyewŏn

Sohn Hye-won (Korean: 손혜원; born on February 15, 1955) is a brand designer and politician in South Korea. While working as a brand designer, she created names and logos for several famous brands, including Innisfree, TVING, Chamisul and others. She entered politics and served as a member of the 20th National Assembly.

== Biography ==
She was born in Seoul in 1955 as the daughter of Son Yong-woo, an independence activist who involved in communist activities at Communist Party of Korea. After graduating from the Hongik University in 1977, she got a job as a designer in the planning department of Hyundai Corporation, temporary worked at a company called Design Focus, and co-founded Crosspoint, a design branding company, in 1986. She was invited to become the head of public relations at the New Politics Alliance for Democracy in 2015. She runs for the 2016 South Korean legislative election and elected as a lawmaker. She left the Democratic Party of Korea after requesting an official investigation into the accusations that she made real estate investments under other people's name. In 2024 she involved in the founding of the Pine Tree Party, a party that made by Song Yong-gil former Mayor of Incheon

== Election results ==
=== General elections ===
Year	Elections	Constituency	Political party	Votes (%)	Results
2016	20th National Assembly General Election	Mapo B (Seoul)	Democratic	49,455 (42.29%)	Won
2024	22nd National Assembly General Election	Proportional representation (3rd)	PTP	124,369 (0.43%)	Not Elected

=== Local elections ===
==== Jeonnam-Gwangju Mokpo Council ====
Year	Elections	Constituency	Political party	Votes (%)	Remarks
2026	9th Iocal Election	Jeonnam-Gwangju Mokpo 4th	Independent	2,057 (24.37%)	Won (2nd)

== See also ==
- Lists of members of the National Assembly (South Korea)
