= Hite Brewery =

South Korean brewery company in Seoul

Hite Brewery Company
- Hite, Prime Max, S Fiber, Hite Stout
- Location: Seoul, South Korea
- Opened: 1933; 93 years ago
- Owned by: Hite Holdings

Active beers
Name	Type
Hite	Lager
Prime Max	Lager
Hite Stout	Stout
Exfeel	Lager

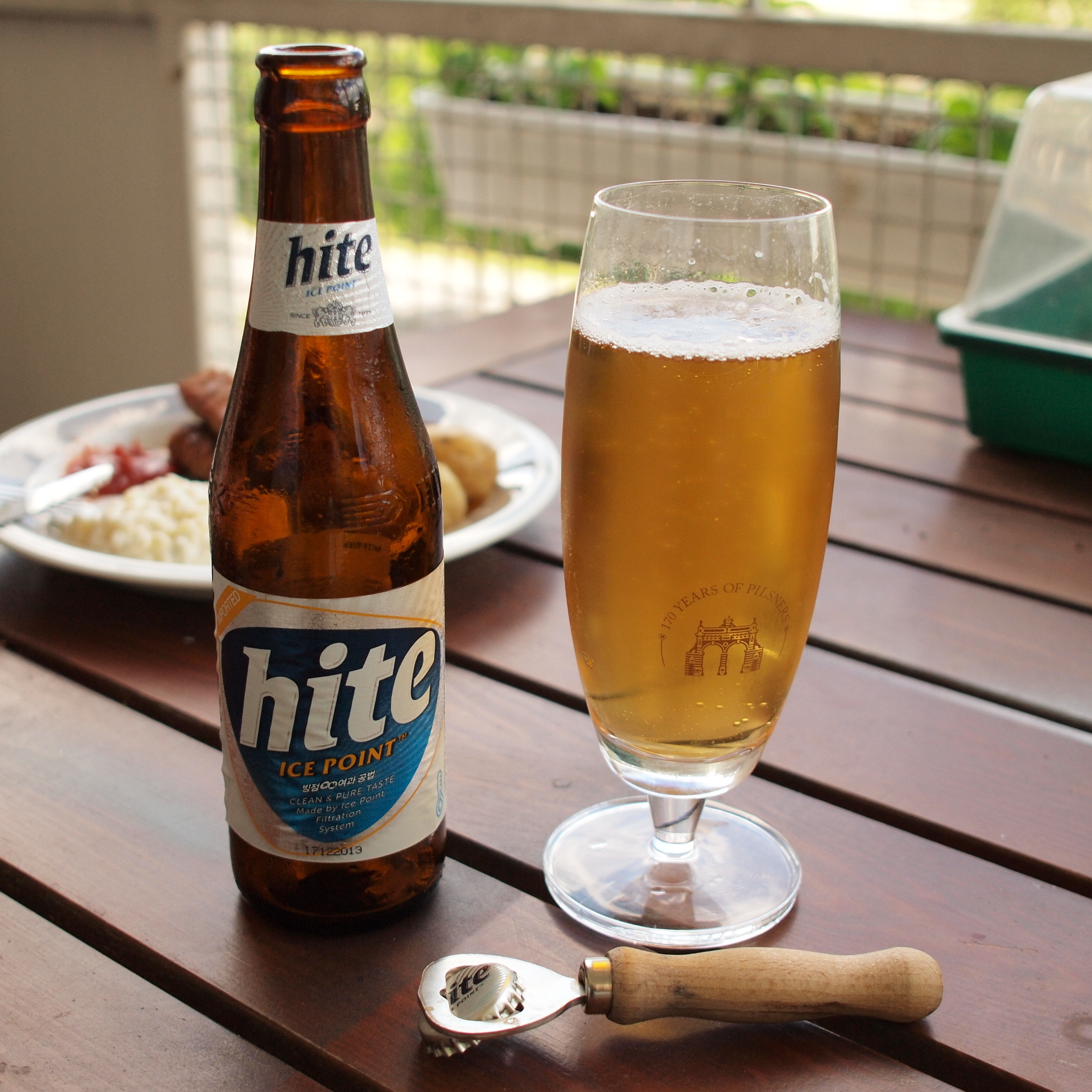
Hite Lager

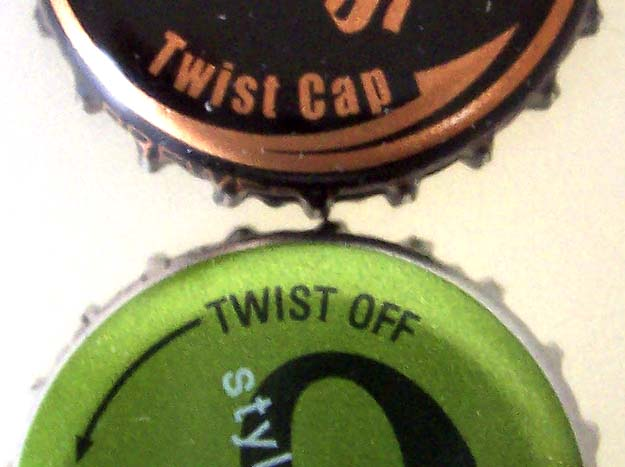
Twist cap of Hite beer

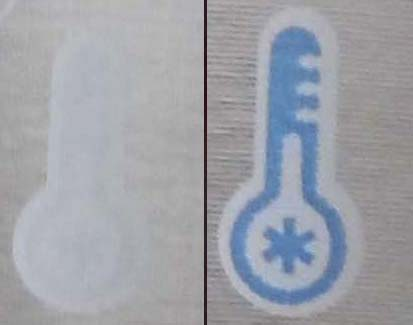
Best taste temperature indicator mark on Hite beer bottle. Left: normal temperature; Right: best taste temperature

Hite Brewery Company Limited (/ˈhaɪt/; Korean: 하이트맥주; KRX: 000080) is a South Korean brewery company headquartered in Yeongdeungpo District, Seoul. Its main products are beer, rice wine, and mineral water.

== History ==
The company was established as Nippon Beer Chosun Co. in 1933 by Dainippon Brewery (Sapporo Breweries). After 1945, Dainippon Brewery property was confiscated by the Korean authorities and became Crown Beer. In 2001 the company had three factories, and in 2002 its market share of the domestic beer market was some 55%, up from 30% in 1992.

In 2006, the company acquired Jinro, the popular South Korean soju company. Among the two companies, Jinro was founded in 1924 as Jincheon Brewing Company in Yonggang-gun, South Pyongan Province. In 1953, the company moved to its current location in Singil-dong, Yeongdeung-gu, Seoul, and changed its name to Seongjo, Cheongnyo in 1954, Jinro in 1966, and Jinro in 1975. In 1980, it won gold prizes in six categories of the 11th International Mainstream Congress (IWSC) and eight categories of the 18th Monde Selection. It released cham Chamisul in 1998, and sold 10 billion bottles in 2006.

Hite Beer was founded in 1933 as Chosun Beer Corporation in Yeongdeung-eup, Siheung-gun, Gyeonggi-do. It was the first Korean beer export in 1962. It introduced Hite in 1993 and changed its name to Hite in 1998. In 2002, it sold 10 billion bottles of Hite beer.

The two companies launched the Hite Jinro Group in 2005. In 2007, the company consolidated its export sector to form an overseas business headquarters and established a local corporation in China. In 2008, the holding company was designated Hite Holdings and the business company as Hite Brewery, and in 2011, it was launched as the current Hite Jinro Corporation

== Sponsorships ==
The company sponsored a StarCraft professional team named Hite Entus. On May 4, 2011, it was announced that the contract between Hite and Entus had expired, and was not renewed. The team announced their return to the name CJ Entus.

Hite Brewery sponsored a soccer team, the POSCO Atoms, in the 1990s.

== Brands and products ==
- Hite (하이트)

The top-selling beer in South Korea. Hite lager is sweet and golden, with thin body and minimal head. It is styled upon American rice lagers such as Budweiser. It is brewed from barley malt and rice. Along with OB and Cass, Hite is often found on draft in South Korean bars and pubs. Most drinkers consider the draft versions of Hite, Oriental Brewery and Cass to be more or less interchangeable in price and taste, as most South Korean beers are brewed from rice. 4.3% ABV.

- Prime Max (프라임 맥스)

The third most popular beer in South Korea. Prime Max is one of only two South Korean beers brewed with 100% malted barley, and it is therefore slightly more expensive than regular Hite. It has a more complex, wheaty flavour. 4.5% ABV.

- Hite Stout (스타우트)

Based on Original Guinness (not to be confused with the creamy Draft Guinness), although it is much sweeter. Hite Stout is a dark bitter beer. It has lost popularity and market share in recent years. 4.5% ABV.

- Exfeel S (엑스필 에스)

S is a light beer targeted at young drinkers and it contains 0.5g of fiber per 100ml. 4.0% ABV.

- Seok Su & Puriss Water (석수와 퓨리스)

Purified water by Hite-Jinro Corp.

- Hite d dry finish

Dry finish is made using a select dry yeast. 5% ABV.

- Hite Soju (하이트 소주)

A brand of soju with a relatively low market share. Not to be confused with White Soju (화이트 소주).

== See also ==
- Korean beer
- Korean cuisine
- Beer
