= Fruit soju =

Korean alcoholic drink

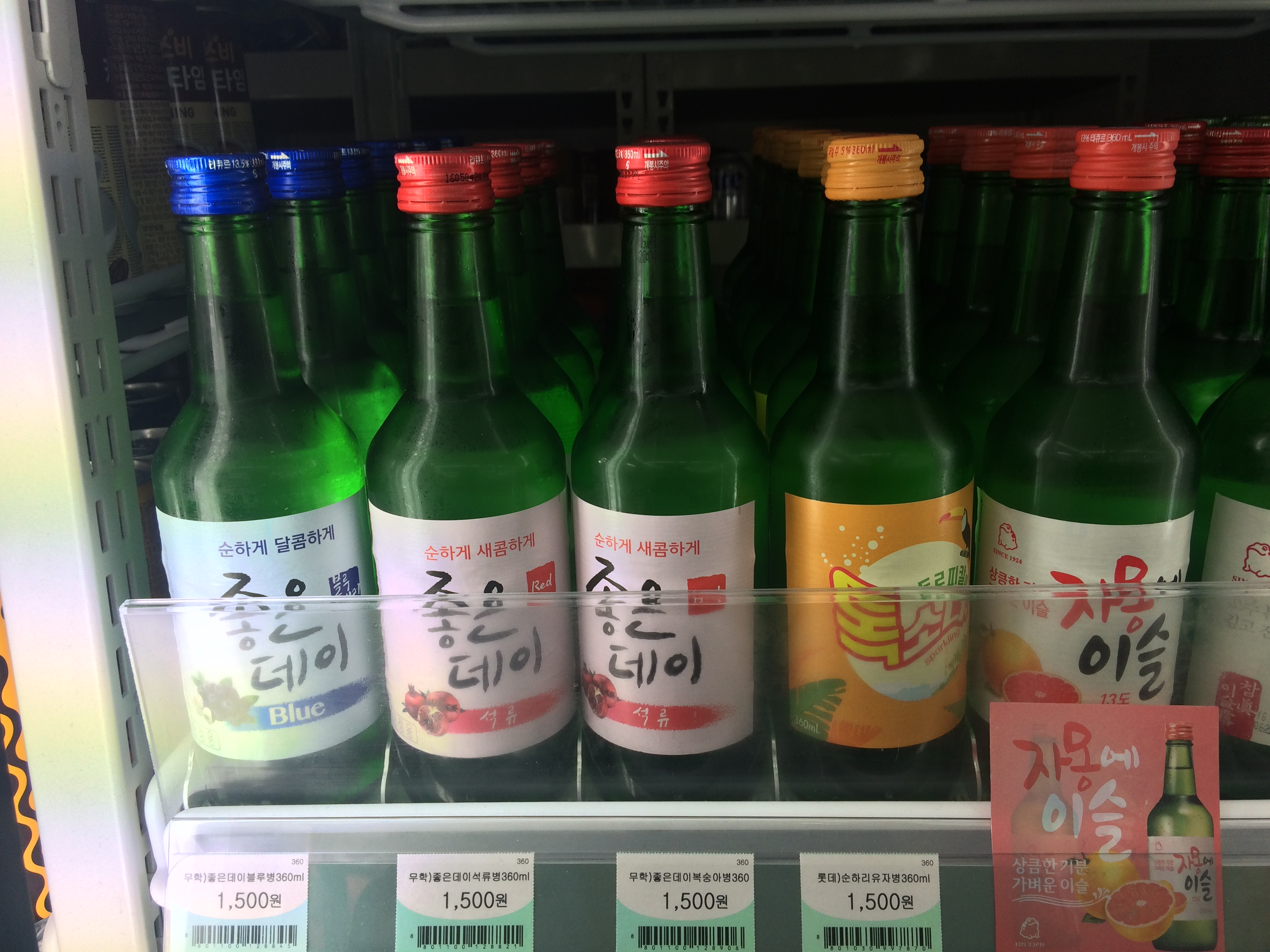
- Bottles of fruit soju for sale in a convenience store

Korean name
- Hangul: 과일소주
- Hanja: 과일燒酒
- RR: gwailsoju
- MR: kwailsoju
- IPA: kwa.il.so.dʑu

Fruit soju (Korean: 과일소주) is a flavored form of soju, an alcoholic drink originally from Korea. In 2015, Lotte Liquor released Soonhari, a fruit-flavored soju (mixju) product launched with a citrus (yuja) variant.

== History ==
Before the first fruit soju was released, standard soju was popular in Korea as an alcoholic drink for adults. However, some people found soju difficult to drink due to its high alcohol content and strong flavor. Its popularity declined because of Korean societal changes regarding work, which resulted in people not having enough time to drink.

In 2015, the first fruit soju, Soonhari, was released. It was flavored with citron and had a lower alcohol content compared to traditional soju, making it popular with younger consumers. After Soonhari had become popular in the soju market, other companies released their own versions. Joenday released three types; Chamisle released Jamongisle, a grapefruit flavored soju that became as popular as Soonhari. Soonhari retained the strong taste of traditional soju, whereas Jamongisle offered a sweeter, milder taste.

The popularity of fruit soju continued for a year after the release of Soonhari, however in March 2016, sales decreased as the hype that first surrounded fruit soju disappeared. Today, fruit soju is not consumed often, and consequently, it is no longer widely available. Currently, sparkling soju is preferred over all other types of this beverage in Korea. However, the drink is only increasing in sales popularity internationally.

== International market ==
Some of Korea's fruit soju brands were released in the United States, including Dew on Jamong (자몽에 이슬) and Soonhari. Lotte Chilsung released Soonhari (순하리) in LA and Colorado, USA, exporting 9,600 boxes (20 bottles per box) in February 2016, and 150,000 boxes in March 2016. A Korean company located in Ohio produced three flavours of fruit soju. In 2022 Lotte Chilsung shipped its flavored soju Soonhari to 37 countries, including the US, Vietnam and the Philippines.

While domestic sales reduced after the mid-2010s boom, overseas demand for fruit-flavored soju increased in the 2020s, contributing to record export values and wider availability in export markets. Reports show fruit-flavored exports of US$91.59 million in 2023, accounting for 28.1% of South Korea's total alcohol exports. In 2024, this had risen to US$96 million, with fruity products making up 48.1% of soju exports by flavor. Fruit-flavored soju has also been promoted internationally through cocktail events and pop-ups. For example, fruit soju was reportedly the most popular item at a Hite Jinro tasting event in London in 2025.

== Characteristics ==
Fruit soju is produced by adding fruit flavorings, sweeteners, or fruit extracts to diluted soju, a clear distilled spirit traditionally made from rice but often produced using neutral spirits derived from starch sources such as wheat, barley, tapioca, or sweet potatoes. The resulting beverage typically has a lower alcohol content to traditional soju and a sweeter taste profile.

Fruit soju has a distinct fruit flavor and lower alcohol content compared to standard soju. The beverage comes in a variety of flavors, such as blueberry, grapefruit, lemon and apple. Special limited editions of fruit soju have been produced, such as a 9,000 bottle limited release batch of C1 Lime soju from the alcohol company Daesun Jujo (대선주조).

Fruit soju contains large amounts of sugar, with each bottle containing 32.4 grams (1.14 oz). The calorie content of each bottle of fruit soju totals 400 kcal; more calories than one bowl of rice and 5 g (0.18 oz) more sugar than a serving of Coke, contributors to obesity and an increase of visceral fat.

A 2016 article identified the most popular fruit soju for university students as Dew on Grapefruit (자몽에 이슬), with students indicating they preferred this less-sweet version of the beverage. The second-most popular fruit soju in this demographic was Bokbadeun Brother (복받은 부라더).

== Brands ==
These are the main brands of fruit soju:

Nat.	Production	Name
(South Korea)	Lotte Chilsung	Soonhari (순하리)
(South Korea)	Joenday	Joenday (좋은데이)
(South Korea)	Hite Jinro	Dew on grapefruit (자몽에 이슬)
(South Korea)	Bohae Brewery	Yipseju (잎새주)
(South Korea)	C1	C1 soju (시원소주)

== See also ==
- Flavored liquor
