= Pine Tree Party (South Korea) =

Pine Tree Party 소나무당
- Leader: Song Young-gil
- Founder: Song Young-gil
- Founded: March 18, 2024
- Dissolved: September 4, 2026
- Merged into: Democratic Party
- Headquarters: 33, Gukhoe-daero 76-gil, Yeongdeungpo-gu, Seoul
- Membership (2024 est.): 20,000
- Ideology: Anti-Yoon
- Political position: Big tent
- Colors: Blue; Red

Website
- k-punisher.kr (archived)

The Pine Tree Party (Korean: 소나무당) was a political party in South Korea founded by Song Young-gil, the former Mayor of Incheon. The party was known for its opposition to former South Korean President Yoon Suk Yeol. The party had both centre-left and right-wing members who are opposed to Yoon. The logo was based on the logo used by the Democratic Party, which existed from 2008 to 2011. Following Song Young-gil's acquittal of bribery charges he announced the party would dissolve and members would join the Democratic Party. The party dissolved on 4 September 2026.

== Notable members ==
- Sohn Hye-won – a former parliament member and designer behind the brand design of Innisfree, TVING, Chamisul and others.
- Byun Hee-jae – South Korean conservative political commentator.

== Election results ==
=== Legislature ===
Election	Leader	Constituency				Party list				Seats		Position	Status
Election	Leader	Votes	%	Seats	+/-	Votes	%	Seats	+/-	No.	+/–	Position	Status
2024	Song Young-gil	18,939	0.07	0	0 / 254	124,369	0.44	0	0 / 46	0 / 300	0	▲8th	Extra-parliamentary
