= Tokki =

Tokki may refer to:

- Canon Tokki, a Japanese manufacturer
- Lucite Tokki, a female pop duo
- Tokki Soju, a brand founded in Brooklyn, New York
