= Flavored liquor =

Alcoholic beverage with added flavoring and, in most cases, added sugar

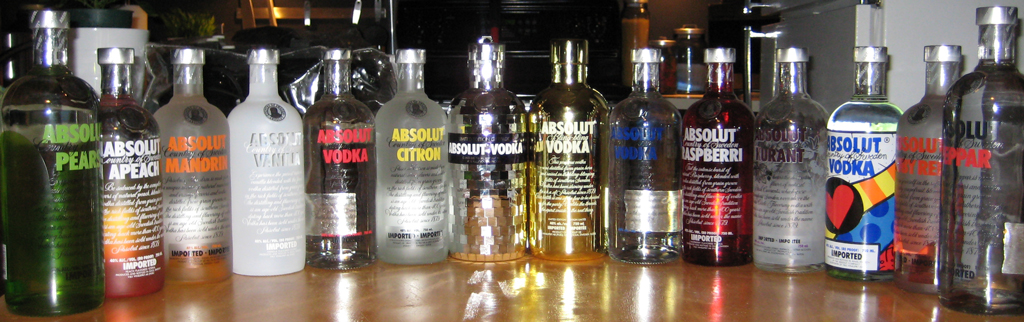
A selection of flavored Absolut Vodka bottles

Flavored liquors (also called infused liquors) are liquors that have added flavoring and, in some cases, a small amount of added sugar. They are distinct from liqueurs in that liqueurs have a high sugar content and may also contain glycerine.

Flavored liquors may have a base of vodka or white rum, both of which have little taste of their own, or they may have a tequila or brandy base. Typically, a fruit extract is added to the base spirit.

== Flavored rice wine, rum, tequila, vodka and whiskey ==
Flavored rums and vodkas frequently have an alcohol content that is 5–10% ABV less than the corresponding unflavored spirit.

- Flavored rice wines—flavors include star anise-coffee, banana-cinnamon, coconut-pineapple, galangal-tamarind, ginger-red chili, green tea-orange, lemon-lemongrass and mango-green chili.
- Flavored rums in the West Indies originally consisted only of spiced rums such as Captain Morgan whereas in the Indian Ocean (Madagascar, Reunion Island and Mauritius) only of vanilla and fruits. Available flavors include cinnamon, lemon, lime, orange, vanilla, and raspberry, and extend to such exotic flavors as mango, coconut, pineapple, banana, passion fruit, and watermelon.
- Flavored tequilas—flavors include lime, orange, mango, coconut, watermelon, strawberry, pomegranate, chili pepper, cinnamon, jalapeño, cocoa and coffee.
- Flavored vodkas—flavors include lemon, lime, lemon-lime, orange, tangerine, grapefruit, raspberry, strawberry, blueberry, teaberry, vanilla, black currant, chili pepper, cherry, apple, green apple, coffee, chocolate, cranberry, peach, pear, passion fruit, pomegranate, plum, mango, white grape, banana, pineapple, coconut, mint, melon, rose, herbs, bacon, honey, cinnamon, kiwifruit, whipped cream, tea, root beer, caramel, marshmallow, and many more.

== Other flavored liquors ==
- Absinthe (wormwood, anise, fennel, and other herbs)
- Akvavit (caraway seeds, anise, dill, fennel, coriander, and grains of paradise)
- Anise liquors: A family of liquors native to the Mediterranean region distilled from aniseseed or grapes and flavored with anise seed:
  - Arak—Arab variant native to the Fertile Crescent
  - Rakı—Turkish variant
  - Ouzo—Greek variant
    - Tsipouro—Ancestral form of Ouzo. Most commonly unflavored, but when flavored, typically flavored with anise.
  - Sambuca-Italian variant
- Compound gin (juniper and other herbs and spices; other forms of gin are not infused, as they are distilled with the flavorings)
  - Sloe gin (sloes)
- Bitters (various herbs)
- Brandy (blackberry, cherry, coffee)

== See also ==
- Alcoholic beverage
- Liquor
- Liqueur
- Bitters
- Fruit soju
- Żubrówka
