= Andong soju =

Traditional type of soju from Andong, Korea

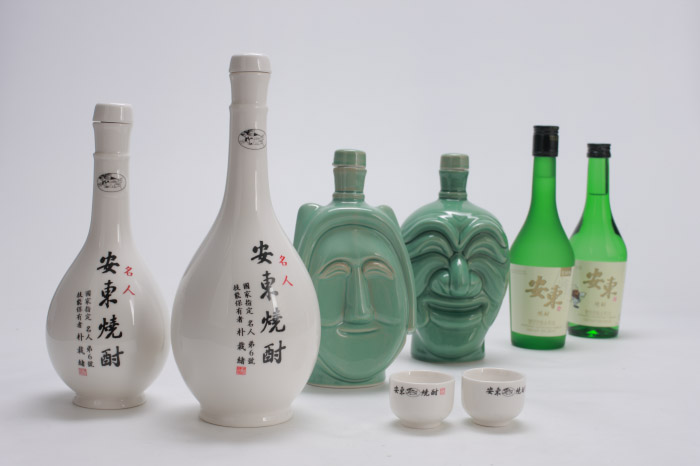
- Type: Soju
- Origin: Andong, Korea

Korean name
- Hangul: 안동소주
- Hanja: 安東燒酒
- RR: Andong soju
- MR: Andong soju
- IPA: an.doŋ.so.dʑu

Andong soju (안동소주; 安東燒酒; in some brand names 安東燒酎) is a traditional type of distilled soju produced in Andong, North Gyeongsang Province, South Korea.

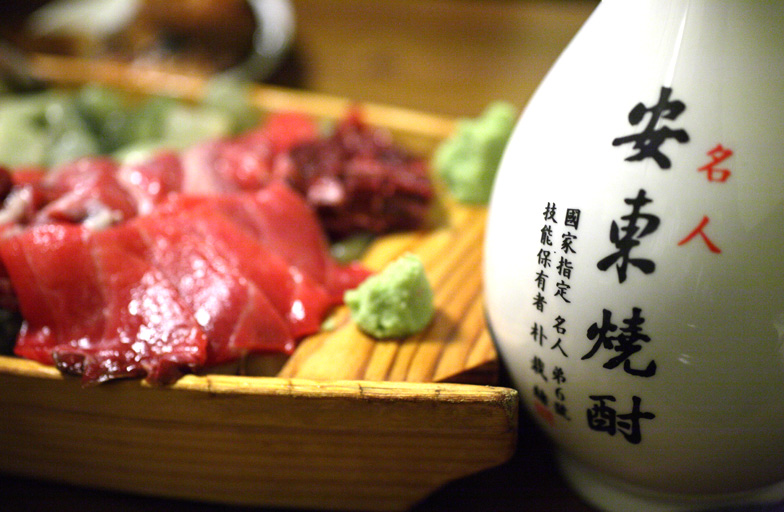
Artisan Park Jae-seo's Andong soju

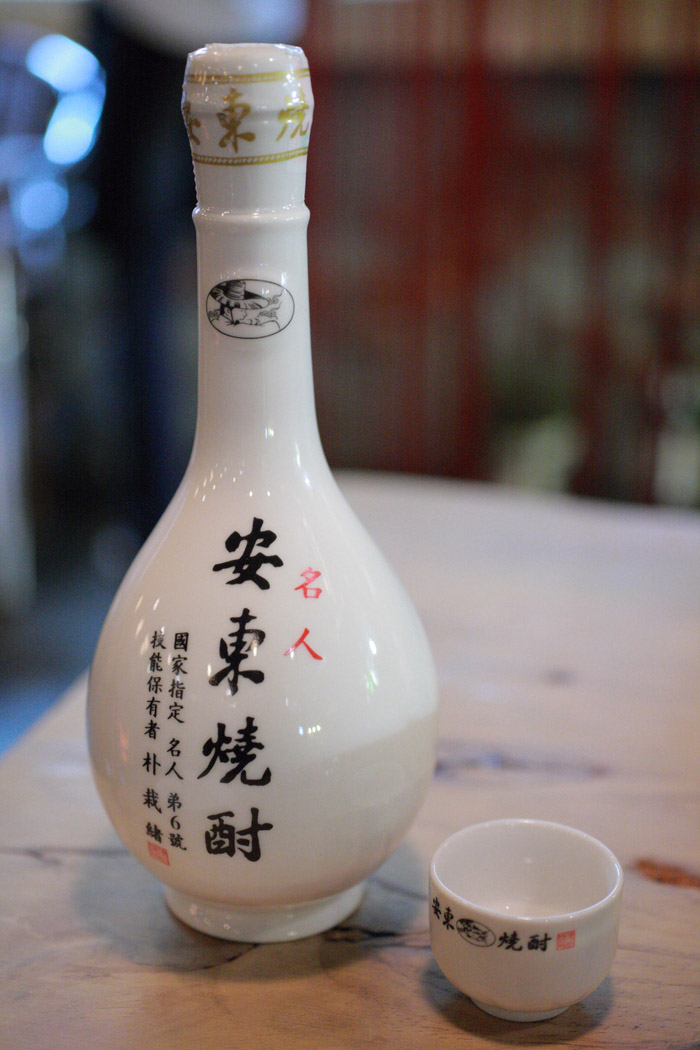
Artisan Park Jae-seo's Andong soju

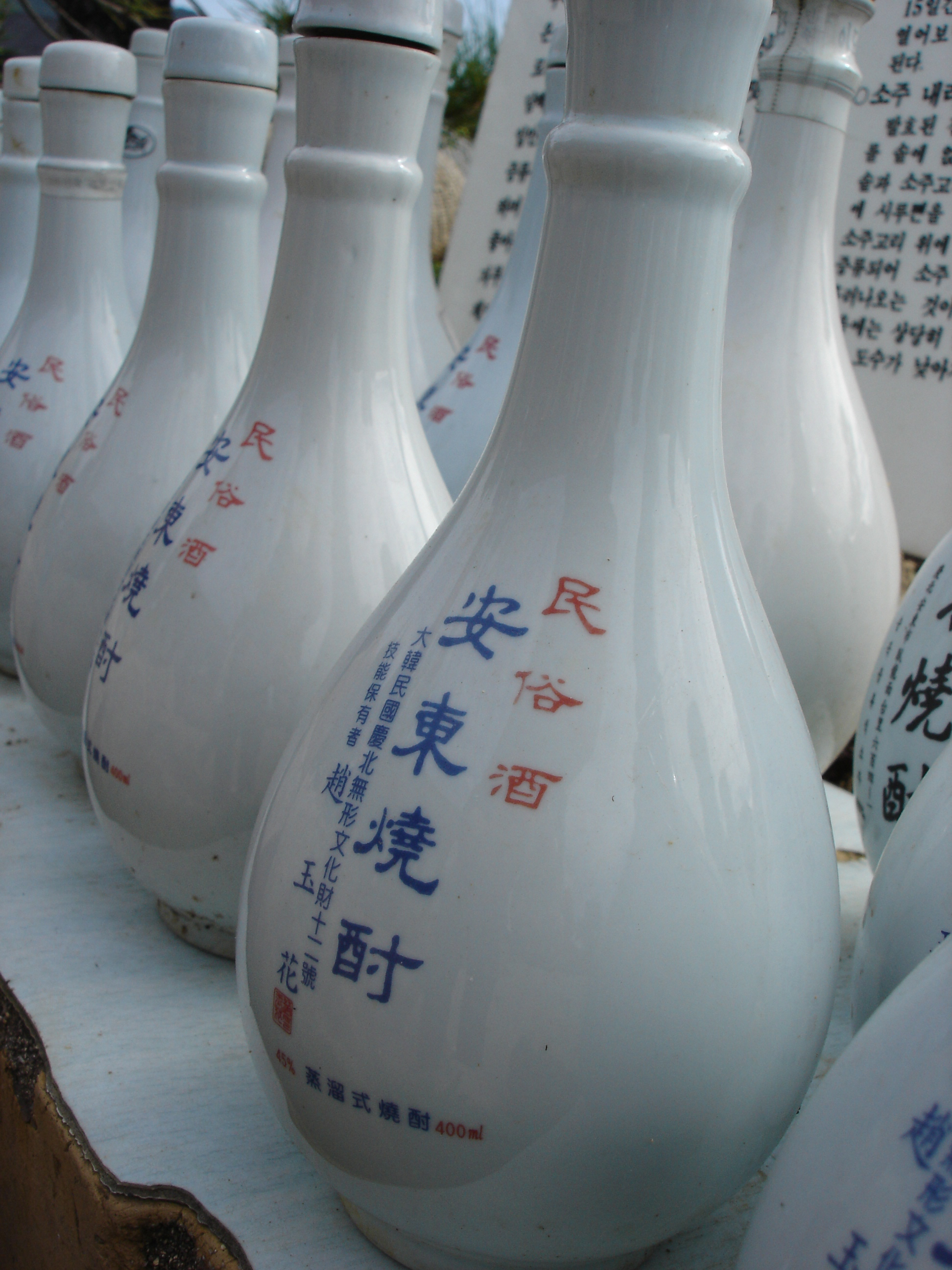
Artisan Joe Ok-wha's Andong soju

== Brewing ==
Andong soju is an alcoholic drink. Ŭmsik timibang (a 17th-century cookbook written by Chang Kyehyang) states that 18 litres (4.0 imp gal; 4.8 US gal) of steamed rice mixed with 9 litres (2.0 imp gal; 2.4 US gal) of nuruk (dried fermentation starter) and 36 litres (7.9 imp gal; 9.5 US gal) of water have to be fermented for 7 days, after which the rice wine is mixed with 2/3 parts water and distilled. Today, the rice wine for distilled soju is usually fermented for about 15 days.

The process of making the fermentation starter (nuruk) for Andong soju consists of washing and drying wheat, which is then crushed and mixed with water. After, it is filtered, fermented, mixed with hard-boiled rice, and placed in a jug with water for about 15 days. The aged liquor is then boiled in a sot (cauldron). A soju gori (two-storied distilling appliance with a pipe), and a cooling device are placed on the sot, and flour dough is used to make an air-tight seal. It is spread on the gap between the soju gori and the cooling device so that no steam escapes.

When the aged liquor is heated, it vaporizes, and the vaporized steam is cooled by the cold water in the upper parts of the soju gori. This causes the vaporized alcohol to be condensed and trickle down through the pipe.

== Origin ==
The development of soju in Andong is related to the Yuan dynasty's movement into the Korean Peninsula during the 13th century. The Yuan dynasty's supply base was in Andong and was established to prepare for an expedition to Japan.

Andong soju dates back to the Silla dynasty (668–935 AD). The distillation skill was developed by alchemists engaged in trade with Arab tribes. Evidence of relations between the Silla and tribes of the Arabian Peninsula includes warrior statues with nonlocal features and Persian glass found at Goereung (hangul: 괘릉; an ancient tomb of Silla in Gyeongju, Gyeongsangbuk-do). China had been drinking hard liquor since the Tang dynasty. With the close relationship between Silla and the Tang dynasty, it can be assumed that strong liquor was used in Korea since the Silla period.

== Artisans ==
The artisans of Andong soju are Jo Ok-hwa (조옥화; 趙玉花) and Park Jae-seo (박재서; 朴栽緖). These artisans keep alive the traditional ways of making Andong soju through the Korean government's support for discovering traditional alcoholic beverages since the 1986 Asian Games and 1988 Summer Olympics.

After the Silla period, the skills of making Andong soju were passed down in Andong. Jo Ok-hwa made and preserved this Andong soju, so she was designated as "Korean food grand master No.20" on September 18, 2000. Daughter-in-law Bae Kyong-hwa (배경화) and son Kim Yeon-park (김연박) continue the tradition.

Park Jae-seo is a descendant of Pak Eung-ju (박응주), the originator of the Bannam Park clan. For preserving his family's tradition, Park Jae-seo was designated as "Korean food grand master No.6" in July 1995.

Andong soju is the only specialty to have two Korean food grandmasters because Jo Ok-hwa and Park Jae-seo's way of making it and materials are different from each other.

Andong soju artisan information
Division	Park Jae-seo	Jo Ok-hwa
Appointed master	Park Jae-seo	Jo Ok-hwa
Appointed date	1995.07.15	2000.09.18
Master No.	No.6	No.20
Appointed Detail	Artisan of Andong soju	Artisan of Andong soju
