= Byun Hee-jae =

South Korean political commentator (born 1974)

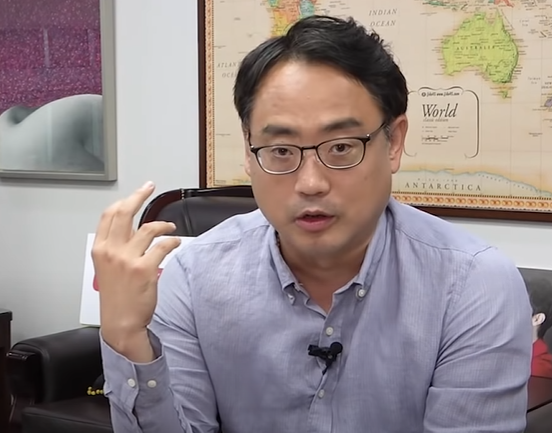
- Byun in 2019
- Born: April 22, 1974 (age 52); Yongsan-gu, Seoul, South Korea
- Education: Seoul National University
- Occupations: Political commentator, Journalist
- Political party: Pine Tree Party

Korean name
- Hangul: 변희재
- Hanja: 邊熙宰
- RR: Byeon Huijae
- MR: Pyŏn Hŭijae

Byun Hee-jae (Korean: 변희재; born 22 April 1974) is a South Korean conservative political commentator. He is also one of the founder of conservative weekly newspaper name Mediawatch.

== Life ==
He was born in Seoul in 1974. He studied in the Aesthetics Department at Seoul National University. Although in 1999 he joined the movement against the largest conservative newspaper in South Korea, The Chosun Ilbo, he later became one of the most notable conservative political commentators in South Korea.

=== Defending Park Geun-hye ===
After the impeachment of Park Geun-hye, Byun launched a campaign defending her. He claimed she was innocent and that the charges against her were fabricated accusations levied by the prosecution for political motives.

=== After 2022 ===
Unlike most of conservative political activists, Byun views president Yoon Suk Yeol very critically, because Yoon was one of the main prosecutor that accused Park Geun-hye. He regularly joins the protest against the president and this make him popular again among the anti-government media and public. Byun runs for 2024 South Korean legislative election as a candidate of Pine Tree Party founded by Song Young-gil, the former mayor of Incheon and former candidate of mayor of Seoul in 2022. On October 12, 2024, he declared political asylum in United States of America. It was during his honeymoon in US.

== Views ==
=== Taiwan ===
In 2019 Byun invited Annette Lu, the former Vice President of the Republic of China to South Korea for advocating normalization of diplomatic relations between South Korea and Taiwan.

=== Impeachment of Park ===
In the interview with Japan Forward, the English newspaper published by Sankei Shimbun, byun argued he has reasonable grounds to believe that prosecutors at that time Yoon and Han Dong-hoon deeply involved in fabricating evidence to remove Park.
