= Tokki Soju =

American soju brand

Tōkki Soju
- Type: Soju
- Manufacturer: Tōkki Soju Global Pte. Ltd.
- Origin: South Korea
- Introduced: 2016
- Alcohol by volume: 23% - 46% (varies by product)
- Proof (US): 46.0 – 92.0
- Website: tokkisoju.com

Tōkki Soju is a brand of soju founded in Brooklyn, New York in 2016 by master distiller Brandon Hill. The company prides themselves on quality over profit, using expensive ingredients that contribute to taste such as glutinous rice.

== Products ==
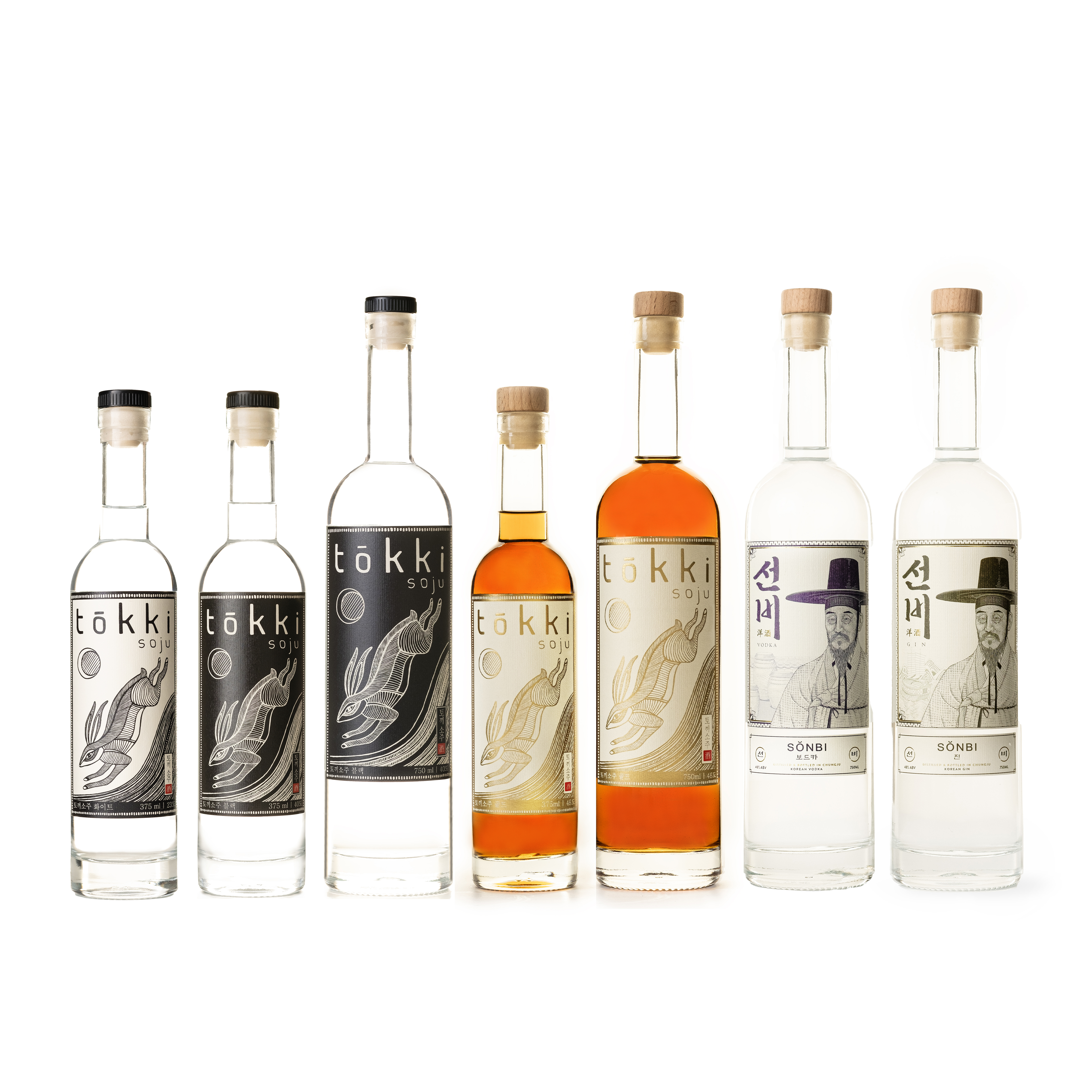
Tokki Soju's full product line-up including Tokki Soju White Label, Tokki Soju Black Label, Tokki Soju Gold Label, Sonbi Gin, and Sonbi Vodka.

Tōkki Soju is made with only 3 ingredients: glutinous rice, water, and nuruk.

- Tōkki Soju White Label 23% ABV. Each 375ml bottle contains ~800g of glutinous rice.
- Tōkki Soju Black Label 40% ABV. Each 750ml bottle contains ~3kg of glutinous rice.
- Tōkki Soju Gold Label 46% ABV, barrel-aged in US Virgin Oak barrels. Sold exclusively at Tōkki Bar

Sŏnbi is Tōkki Soju's Western spirits line.

- Sŏnbi Gin 48% ABV. Made with 12 ingredients including pine leaves, juniper berries, lemon, schisandra berries, citrus, coriander, lemongrass, chrysanthemum, glutinous rice, citrus peels, licorice, and green cardamom.
- Sŏnbi Vodka 40% ABV. Triple distilled and made with glutinous rice.

== Key Dates ==
Founder Brandon Hill's business partner, Douglas Park, joined in August of 2016, just 6 months after the company was created.

Park's role switched from partner to CEO in October 2018. Under his leadership, the company created additional products and moved production to Korea where they believed there would be more meaning to create with local ingredients and support Korean agriculture.

They began construction of their distillery in September 2019, and finally finished construction in May 2020 launching their first product in Korea in July 2020. As their products use a lot of glutinous rice, the company contributes to 30% of Chungju's rice market.

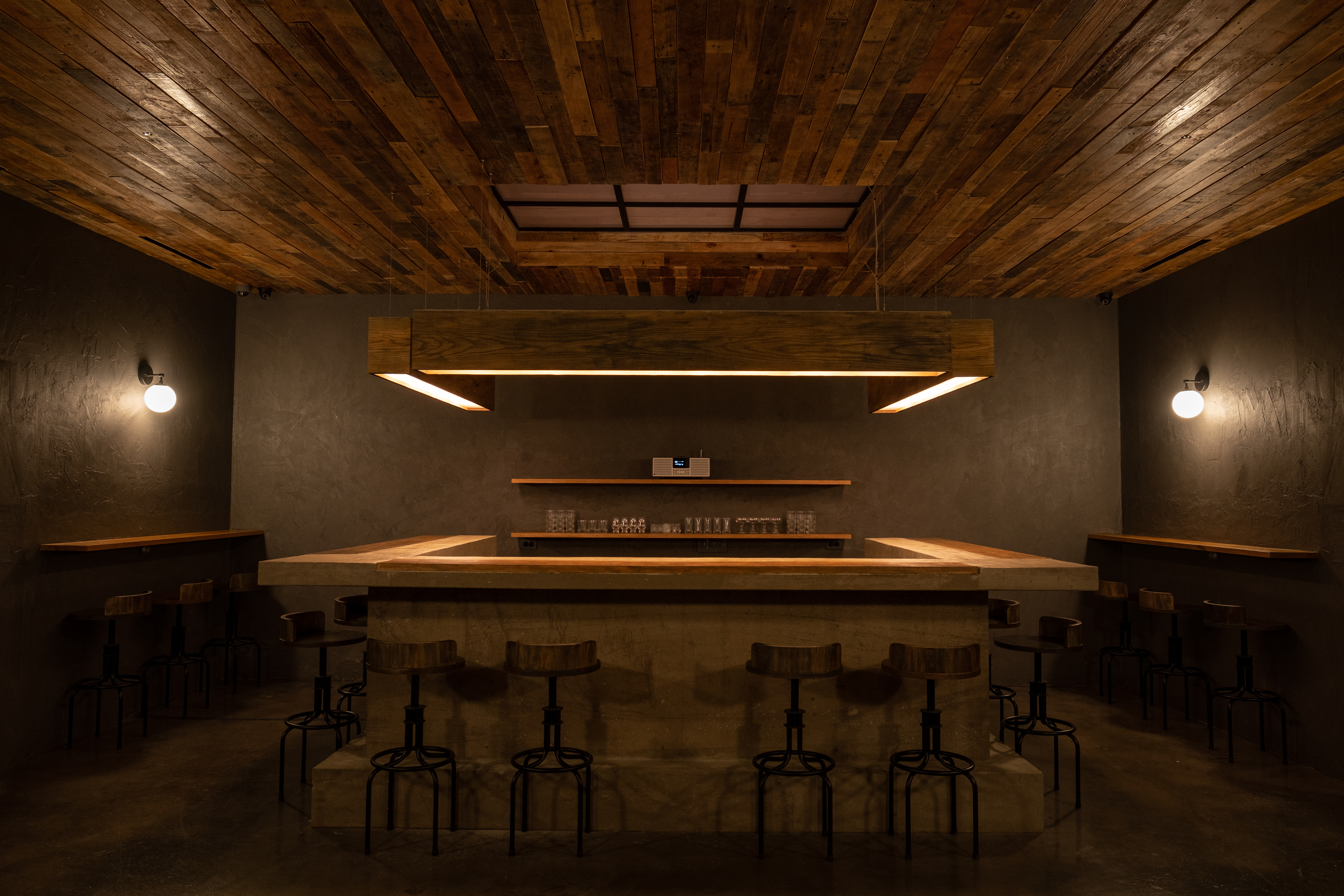
Tokki Bar's interior. Located inside of Ryse, Autograph Collection hotel in Hongdae, Seoul.

In May 2021, Tōkki Soju opened an estate bar called Tōkki Bar inside of Ryse, Autograph Collection hotel in Hongdae. All cocktails and spirits served at this bar are produced by the Tōkki Soju distillers.

On June 6, 2021 they launched their barrel-aged soju called Tōkki Soju Gold Label. While technically, this is considered a whiskey, Tōkki Soju intentionally kept the category as barrel-aged soju as their company mission is to elevate the category of soju.

On June 27, 2021 they launched their Western spirits line, Sŏnbi. Currently, they have two spirits under the Sŏnbi brand -- Sŏnbi Gin and Sŏnbi Vodka.

Brandon Hill has left the company in 2025 and is no longer involved with Tokki Soju and Sonbi.

== History ==
After living in Korea in 2011, Hill moved to New York where he was distilling whiskey and rum in Brooklyn.

At that time, New York was becoming a hot spot for high-end Korean restaurants, many of which were earning Michelin stars for their efforts. Unfortunately, only green-bottle soju was really available at the time in the US and was unable to be paired with the modern high-end Korean cuisine. These restaurants relied on wine menus to pair with their Korean food instead.

When a Korean restaurant in Brooklyn asked Bran to create a traditional quality soju for their restaurant, the market presented itself and Tokki was created.

== Branding ==
The name of the brand was created because Hill was living in Korea in 2011 where he learned how to make soju. 2011 is the Year of the Rabbit, and so, he decided to name the brand Tōkki Soju.

== Sonbi Spirits ==
Sŏnbi is Tokki Soju's Western spirits line. Sŏnbi Gin is the first and only internationally recognized Korean gin, winning the highest accolade, Double Gold, in SF Spirits Competition and Gold in the Asia International Spirits Competition in 2021. The label has a drawing of a sonbi, virtuous scholars in the Goryeo and Joseon Dynasty who passed up positions of wealth and power to lead lives of study and integrity. The background drawings are different for each type of alcohol produced. Sŏnbi Vodka has a drawing of onggi and Sŏnbi Gin has a drawing of a turtle ship.

== Background & Tasting Notes ==
PRODUCT	BACKGROUND	TASTING NOTES	HOW TO ENJOY
Tokki Soju White Label	Made in the traditional Korean way with modern equipment. No chemicals, additives, or sugars added.	Light tapioca pudding, hint of vanilla, light earthiness	Chilled or room temperature, neat In low ABV cocktails
Tokki Soju Black Label	A full body spirit that really makes the glutinous rice shine. It has a rich mouthfeel with a clean backbone.	Rich tapioca pudding, vanilla bean, yogurt	Neat On the rocks In cocktails of all types
Tokki Soju Gold Label	Smooth and complex, this barrel-aged soju is enjoyed by whiskey-lovers and soju-lovers alike.	Vanilla caramel nose, dark cherry, dark chocolate	Best neat Add ice to open up flavors
Sonbi Gin	Made in the London Dry Style with a focus on Korean ingredients. Sonbi has a citrus forward nose. The 10 botanicals that make up Sonbi are well-balanced with sweet notes on the front and spice on the backend that make it a very versatile spirit for a wide range of cocktails.	Floral citrus notes, peppery, savory undertones	In cocktails

== Awards & Accolades ==
Tōkki Soju Black Label won Gold in New York International Spirits Competition and San Francisco Spirit Competition.

Sŏnbi Gin is the first and only internationally recognized Korean gin, winning the highest accolade, Double Gold, in SF Spirits Competition.

Tōkki Soju Gold Label also won a Double Gold in SF Spirits Competition.
