= Soju =

Distilled alcoholic beverage from Korea

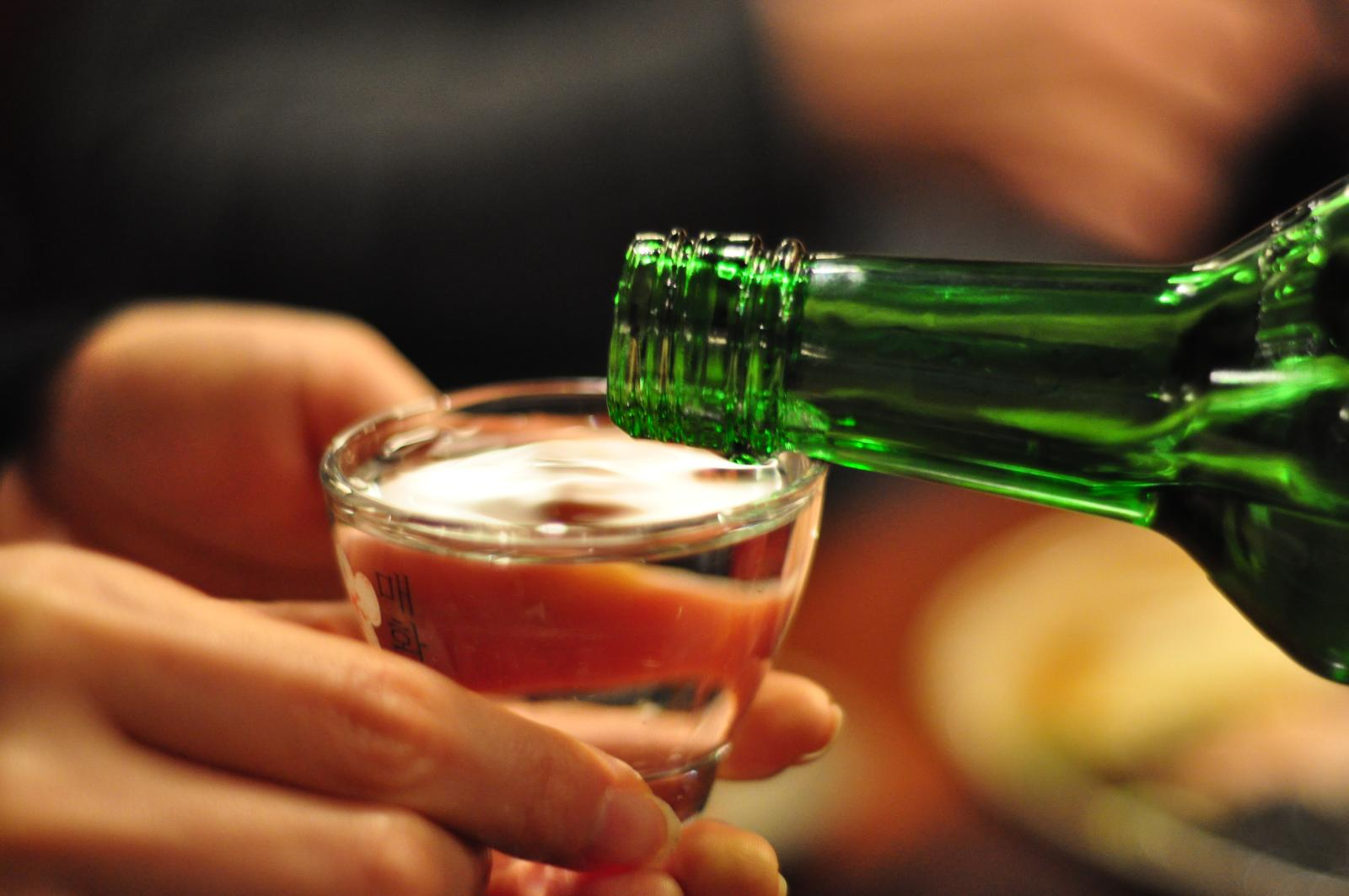
- Pouring soju into a soju glass
- Type: Spirit
- Origin: Goryeo, now Korea, Gaegyeong
- Color: Clear
- Ingredients: Rice, distilled ethanol, sweeteners, flavorings
- Related products: baijiu, shōchū

Korean name
- Hangul: 소주
- Hanja: 燒酒
- RR: soju
- MR: soju

Soju (English pronunciation: /ˈsoʊdʒuː/; Korean: 소주) is a clear and colorless distilled alcoholic beverage from Korea, traditionally made from rice, but later from other grains and has a flavor similar to vodka. It is usually consumed neat. Its alcohol content varies from about 12.5% to 53% alcohol by volume (ABV). Since 2007, low alcohol soju (below 20%) has become the most common type.

Traditionally, most brands of soju are produced in the Andong region of South Korea, but also in other regions and countries. While soju was traditionally made from rice, South Korean ethanol producers replace rice with other starch, such as cassava due to significantly lower capital costs. Soju often appears similar to several other East Asian liquors while differing in alcohol content.

== Etymology ==
Soju (소주; 燒酒) means "burned liquor", with the first syllable, so (소; 燒; "burn"), referring to the heat of distillation and the second syllable, ju (주; 酒), meaning "alcoholic drink". Its original name was ara-soju, with the prefix referencing arak, a spirit made from distilled wine, and with time the prefix was dropped. Etymological dictionaries record that China's shaozhou (shāojiǔ, 烧酒), Japan's shochu (shōchū, 焼酎), and Korea's soju (soju, 燒酒) have the same etymology. In 2008, "soju" was included in the Merriam-Webster Dictionary. Merriam-Webster dated the word's appearance in the American English lexicon to 1951. In 2016, the word was included in the Oxford Dictionary of English.

Another name for soju is noju (노주; 露酒; "dew liquor"), with its first syllable, no/ro (노/로; 露; "dew"), likening the droplets of the collected alcohol during the distilling process to dewdrops. Some soju brand names include iseul (이슬), the native-Korean word for "dew", or no/ro (로; 露), the Sino-Korean word for "dew".

Soju is sometimes mistakenly referred to as cheongju (청주), a Korean rice wine. Mass-produced soju is also mistaken for Chinese baijiu, a grain liquor, and shōchū, a Japanese liquor.

== History and production ==
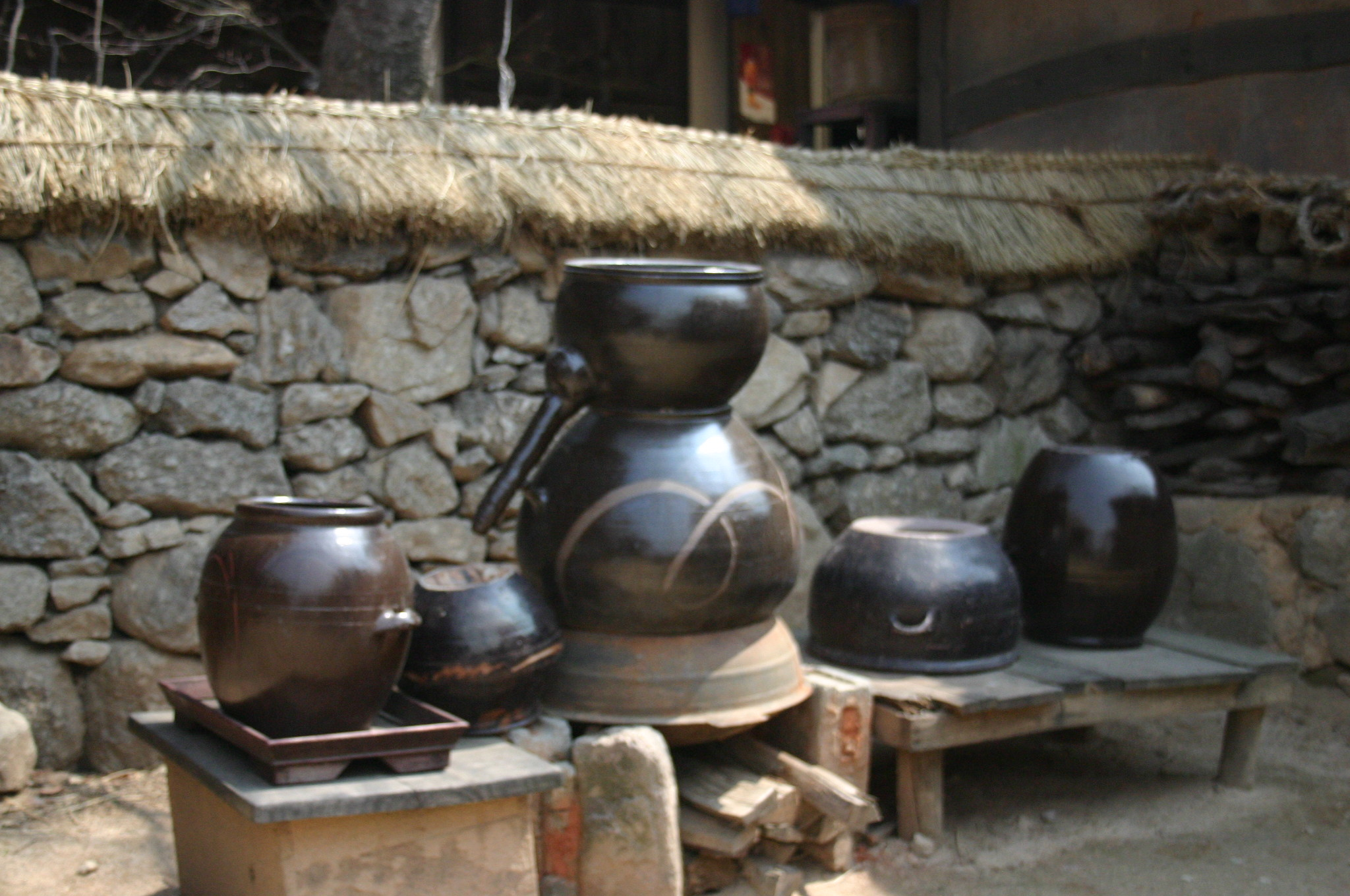
Sot (cauldron), soju gori (distilling appliance), and different hangari (earthenware pots) for making traditional soju

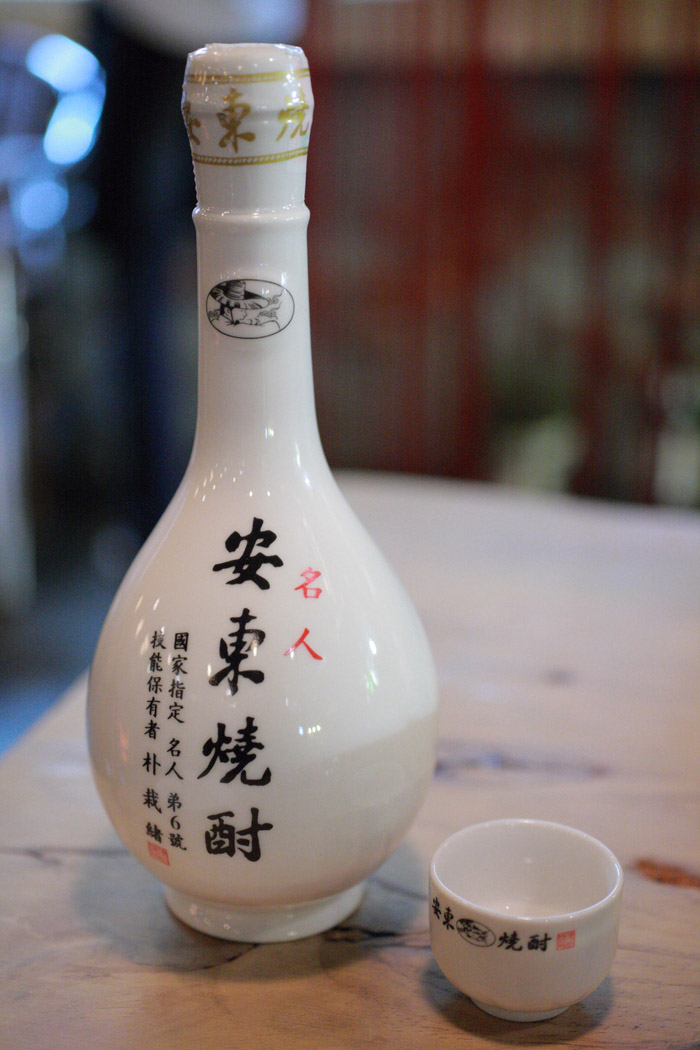
Famous artisan Park Jae-seo's Andong soju

The origin of soju dates back to 13th-century Goryeo. The Yuan Mongols acquired the technique of distilling arak from the Persians during their invasions of the Levant, Anatolia, and Persia, and in turn introduced it to the Korean Peninsula during the Mongol invasions of Korea (1231–1259). Distilleries were set up around the city of Gaegyeong, the then-capital (current Kaesong). In the areas surrounding Kaesong, soju is still called arak-ju (아락주). Andong soju, the direct root of modern South Korean soju varieties, started as the home-brewed liquor developed in the city of Andong, where the Yuan Mongols' logistics base was located during this era.

Soju is traditionally made by distilling alcohol from fermented rice. The rice wine for distilled soju is usually fermented for about 15 days, and the distillation process involves boiling the filtered, mature rice wine in a sot (cauldron) topped with soju gori (a two-story distilling appliance with a pipe). In the 1920s, over 3,200 soju breweries existed throughout the Korean Peninsula.

Soju was traditionally a beverage distilled from rice with 35% ABV until 1965, when diluted soju with 30% ABV made from other fermented substances appeared with South Korean government's prohibition of the traditional distillation of soju from rice, in order to alleviate rice shortages. Soju was then made from ethanol distilled to 95% ABV from sweet potatoes and tapioca, which was mixed with flavorings, sweeteners, and water. The end products are marketed under a variety of soju brand names. A single supplier (Korea Ethanol Supplies Company) sells ethanol to all soju producers in South Korea. Until the late 1980s, saccharin was the most popular sweetener used by the industry, but it has since been replaced by stevioside. The use of other grains and starches led different sojus to have different aroma and flavor.

During the 1970s, the national government of South Korea started to monopolize the soju industries. By the 1970s there were about 300 domestic soju companies. In 1973, the South Korean government began to consolidate various local soju producers. Each province was designated one soju producer per regional market. Each producer was to create a brand of soju that represented its region. By the end of the consolidation, a producer existed for each of the provinces. The government then passed two policies. The first was a mandatory local soju purchase policy. The policy required each provincial alcohol wholesaler to purchase more than 50 percent of their soju from within their own province. The second was the input allocation policy. This policy gave the government the responsibility to administer ethanol spirit, the main ingredient in soju. Each soju company was designated an amount based on their national market share in the previous year. These policies were created with the intention of protecting local firms and discouraging excessive competition.

This decision by the government advanced the efficient control of tax revenue. As a result of this consolidation, a few companies began to dominate the market. As of October 2023, one firm, HiteJinro, accounts for almost half of the market while 4 smaller companies accounts for another 40 percent.

Due to the protection by the government's policies, local firms took the majority of market share in their regional markets. In the 1980s and 1990s, there was a trade liberalization trend which led the South Korean government to begin deregulating the soju industry. The government lifted its restrictions on new licenses for alcohol distribution in January 1991. It also lifted restrictions on soju production in March 1993. Various restrictions on the production of soju were also removed or weakened. The government also abolished the mandatory local soju purchase policy in January 1992.

Between 1993 and 1995, HiteJinro's market share in regional markets outside its own increased and local companies saw a steady decline. As a result of this loss in market share, local soju companies lobbied to reintroduce the protection policies that had been removed. In response, the National Assembly of South Korea reintroduced the mandatory local soju purchase policy in October 1995. However, the case was challenged and the case was eventually decided by the Supreme Court of Korea that the policy was unconstitutional and abolished it in December 1996.

Soju alcohol content has trended downward from the 1970s onward. The ABV of 30% fell to 25% by 1973, and 23% by 1998. Currently, soju with less than 17% ABV are widely available. In 2017, a typical 375-milliliter (13.2 imp fl oz; 12.7 U.S. fl oz) bottle of diluted soju retails at ₩1,700 (approximately $1.93) in supermarkets and convenience stores, and for ₩4,000–5,000 (approximately $4.54–5.68) in restaurants.

Several regions have resumed distilling soju from grains since 1999. Traditional hand-crafted Andong soju has about 45% ABV. Hwayo (화요) is a brand with five different mixes constituting an ABV range from 17% to 53%. In 2019, Jinro soju was the largest selling branded spirit in the world. Fruit sojus have been produced since 2015.

Soju is a specialty in North Korea.

== Etiquette ==
The most important rule in Korean drinking etiquette is that the youngest person in the group pours the drinks for their elders. It applies not only to age but also to the hierarchy within a company. When pouring alcohol, both hands should be used to pour. When receiving alcohol, both hands should also be used to hold the glass. It is considered rude to pour oneself a drink.

== Bottles and recycling ==
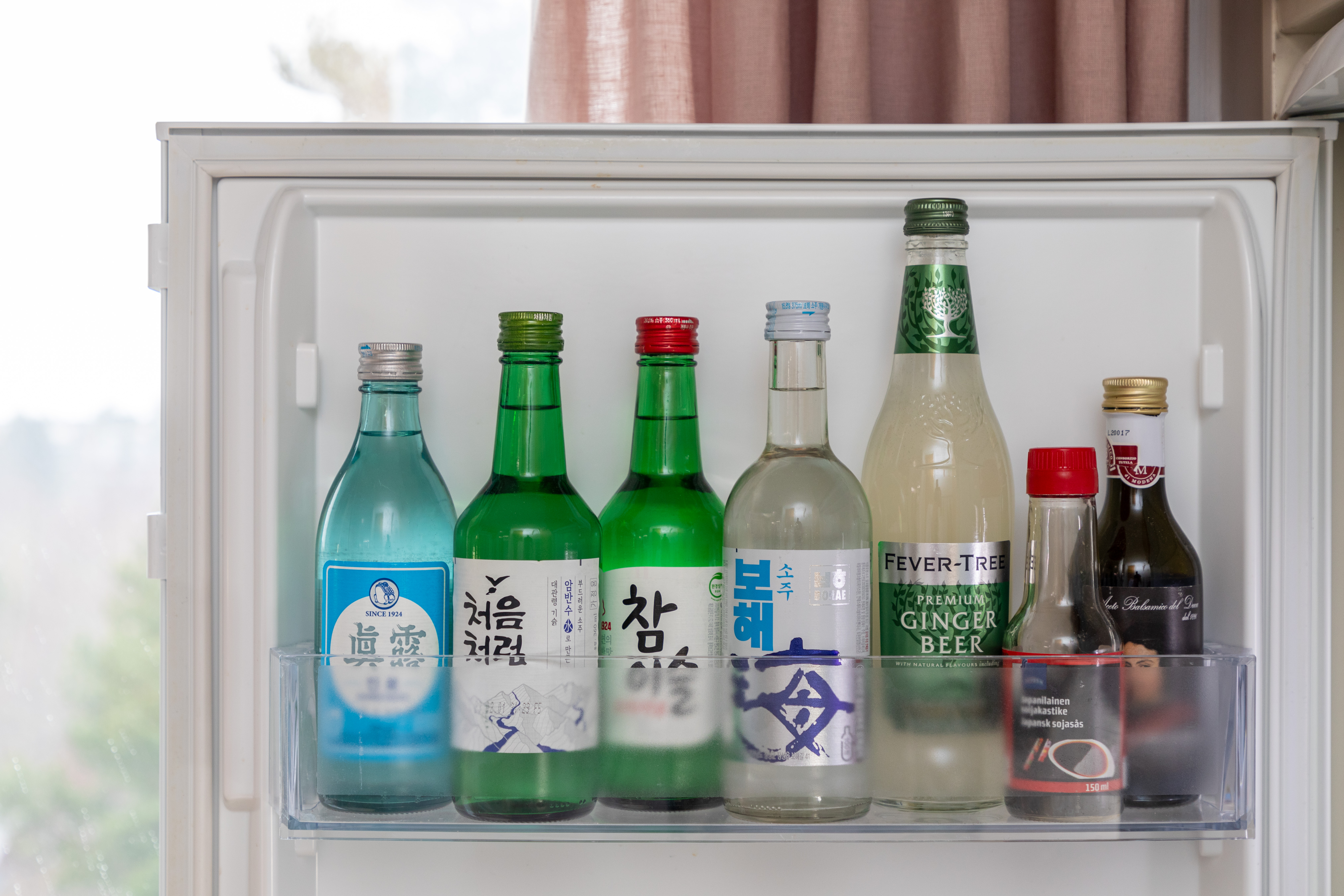
Bottles of different soju brands.

Soju is a popular Korean alcoholic beverage, with over 917 million liters being sold in Korea. In 1994 Doosan Beverage started using green 360ml bottles to associate Soju with being clean and fresh; being a great success, other brands started using the same bottles.

In 2009 seven soju companies made a voluntary agreement to start manufacturing soju in the same sized green bottle with the same design, these bottles can then be sold back to and reused by soju manufacturers. While the program was voluntary, it was beneficial to the companies producing soju by saving 88 won per bottle. While this simple idea allowed multiple companies to recycle the same bottle, increasing their savings while benefiting the environment, consumer participation needed to be improved. In 2015 South Korea revised an act that promoted recycling and it was found that the return of soju bottles increased significantly. The system was further improved in 2016, and the deposit was increased in 2017; in 2018 the recovery rate of soju bottles was 97.2% compared to 87.9% in 2015.

The return of recyclable materials is driven by South Korea's Beverage Container Deposit System. This system imposes a deposit on recyclable containers that is included in the sale price and refunded upon return. South Korea is recognized as a leading country when it comes to recycling, with Yale's Center for Environmental Law and Policy ranking South Korea as number one with an environmental performance index score of 67.1/100. South Korea attributes their success to volume-based fees for waste management. With this system households purchase government-issued trash bags while recyclables are separated and collected for free. Local governments set the price of these bags based on volume and are adjusted to reflect the cost of the waste management process.

Some companies started producing different colored bottles in 2019. According to the Korea Times, Soju manufacturing companies Hite and Muhak introduced non-standard bottles. This created a dispute between companies with claims that sorting out non standard bottles was costly. This has resulted in a new agreement where companies can trade non-standard bottles for the standard green ones with each other.

== Soju outside Korea ==
=== China ===
There are a number of soju brands directly outside the Korean Peninsula for the ethnic Korean population, and most use rice as the foundation since the price is significantly cheaper than in South Korea. Soju from South Korea, from firms like Jinro, is also imported.

=== Canada ===
Liquors in Canada are subject to regulations that vary from province to province. In Ontario, the provincially run Liquor Control Board of Ontario (LCBO) sells soju, but not all LCBO locations carry it. However, since the LCBO introduced online ordering in 2016, soju can be ordered for home delivery anywhere in the province.

=== United States ===
The liquor licensing laws in the states of California and New York specifically exempt the sale of soju of up to 25% alcohol from regulation relating to the sale of other distilled spirits, allowing businesses with a beer/wine license to sell it without requiring the more expensive license required for other distilled spirits. The soju must contain less than 25% alcohol, and be clearly labeled.

This has led to the appearance in the United States of many soju-based equivalents of traditional Western mixed drinks normally based on vodka or similar spirits, such as the soju martini and the soju cosmopolitan. Another consequence is that the manufacturers of similar distilled spirits from other parts of Asia, such as Japanese shōchū, have begun to re-label their products as soju for sale in those regions.

Jinro's American division partnered with Korean pop star PSY to promote soju in the U.S., and in 2013 partnered with the Los Angeles Dodgers to sell soju at its games.

== Brands ==
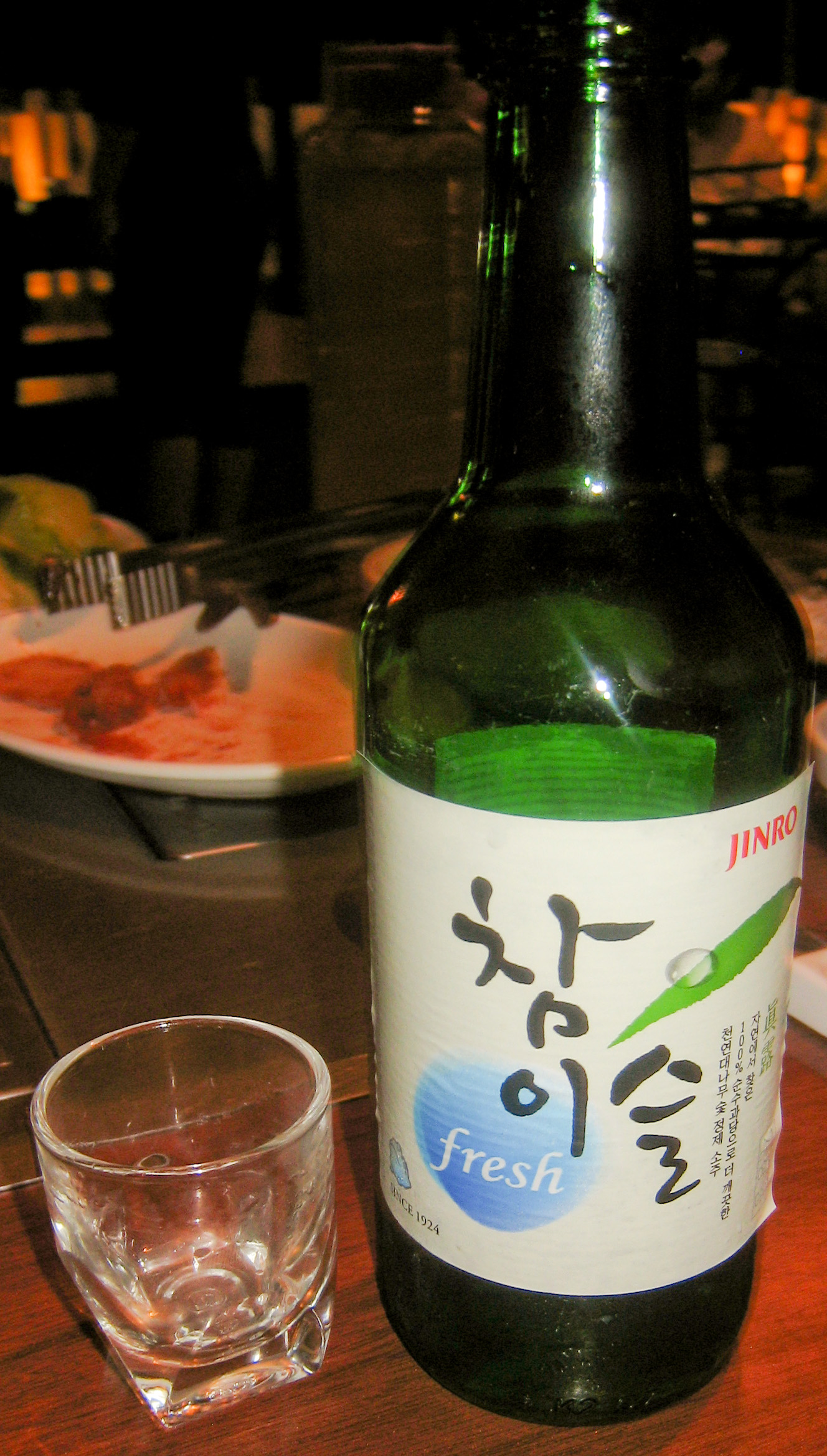
A bottle of Chamisul (참이슬) soju

Jinro is the largest manufacturer of soju, accounting for half of all white spirits sold in South Korea. Soju accounts for 97% of the category. Global sales in 2013 were 750 million bottles. The most popular variety of soju is currently Chamisul (참이슬 - literally meaning "real dew"), a quadruple-filtered soju produced by Jinro, but recently Chum-Churum (처음처럼, lit. "like the first time") of Lotte Chilsung (롯데칠성) and Good Day (좋은데이) of Muhak (무학) are increasing their market share. However, the popularity of brands varies by region. In Busan, Shiwon Soju (시원 소주-"refreshing soju") is the local and most popular brand. Yipseju (잎새주 - "Leaf Soju"/"Maple Soju") is popular in the South Jeolla Province region. The Daegu Metropolitan Area has its own soju manufacturer, Kumbokju, with the popular brand Cham (참). Further north in the same province, Andong Soju is one of Korea's few remaining traditionally distilled brands of soju. On the Special Self-Governing Province of Jeju Province, Hallasan Soju is the most common brand, being named after the island's main mountain Mt. Halla. Also, there is pureun-bam (푸른 밤/meaning: blue night) made by Jeju-soju. In South Gyeongsang Province and Ulsan, the most popular is Good Day (좋은데이), produced by Muhak in Changwon. However, as soon as one crosses the border from Ulsan north to Gyeongju in North Gyeongsang Province, it is almost impossible to buy White Soju, and the most popular brands are Chamisul and Cham. Since 2015, the new trends of soju include fruit soju and sparkling soju, which have become increasingly popular in Korea, especially for young people. Sae-ro, a sugar-free soju, is also popular among young people.

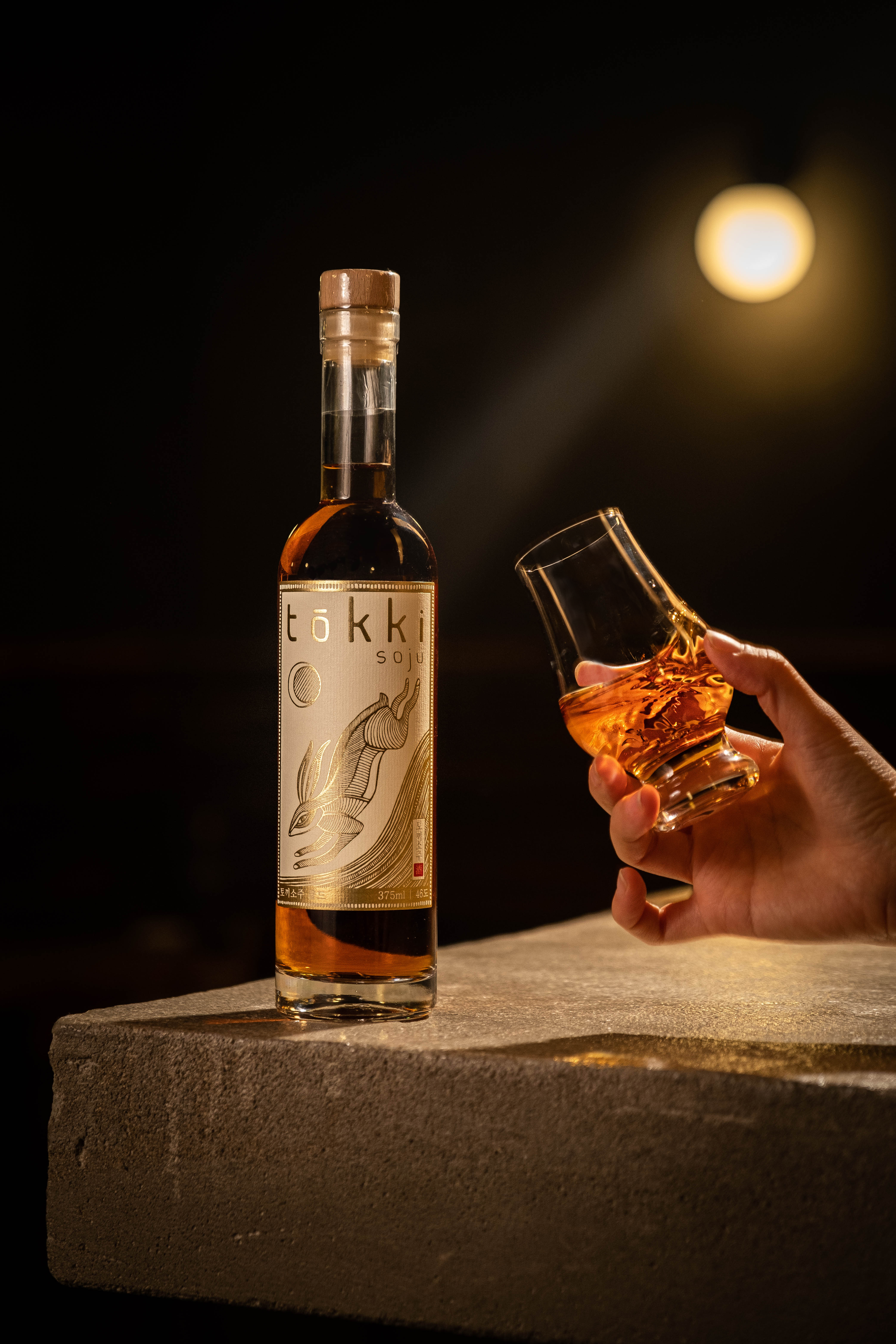
A bottle of Tokki Soju Gold at their estate bar in Seoul, Tokki Bar

New American producers are entering the market. Some, like Tokki Soju and West 32 Soju, with initial market penetration in major markets like New York, are finding critical success. Tokki Soju won double gold for their barrel-aged soju, Tokki Soju Gold, in the San Francisco Spirits Competition 2021 and 2022. West 32 Soju won a gold medal at the 2017 New York International Spirits Competition. Minhwa Spirits, located in Doraville, Georgia, is a Korean-American craft distillery and brewery known for producing artisanal soju and makgeolli using traditional ingredients and methods. Their flagship Yong Soju (40% ABV) won Double Gold at the 2024 and Best in class at 2025 San Francisco World Spirits Competition and was named Soju of the Year at the 2024 USA Spirits Ratings.

A new all natural soju distilled in Germany called ISAE is also entering the premium soju market. It is distilled according to the German Purity Law (the Reinheitsgebot) for grain spirits of 1789 and uses 100% regional winter wheat and organic rice.

Recently, soju has been produced for the younger generation. It mainly contains fruit flavor and produces and sells soju with low frequency.

== Consumption ==
On average, South Koreans drink the most hard liquor of any nationality.

Although beer, whiskey, and wine have been gaining popularity in recent years, soju remains one of the most popular alcoholic beverages in Korea because of its ready availability and relatively low price. More than 3 billion bottles were consumed in South Korea in 2004. In 2006, it was estimated that the average adult Korean (older than 20) had consumed 90 bottles of soju during that year. In 2014, it was reported that South Koreans of drinking age consumed an average of 13.7 shots of spirit per week, the highest per capita consumption of alcoholic spirits of any country. However, due to the lower concentration of alcohol in soju compared to other hard spirits and the lack of an international standard for the volume of a shot, this does not necessarily imply a larger consumption of alcohol from hard spirits.

=== Cocktails ===
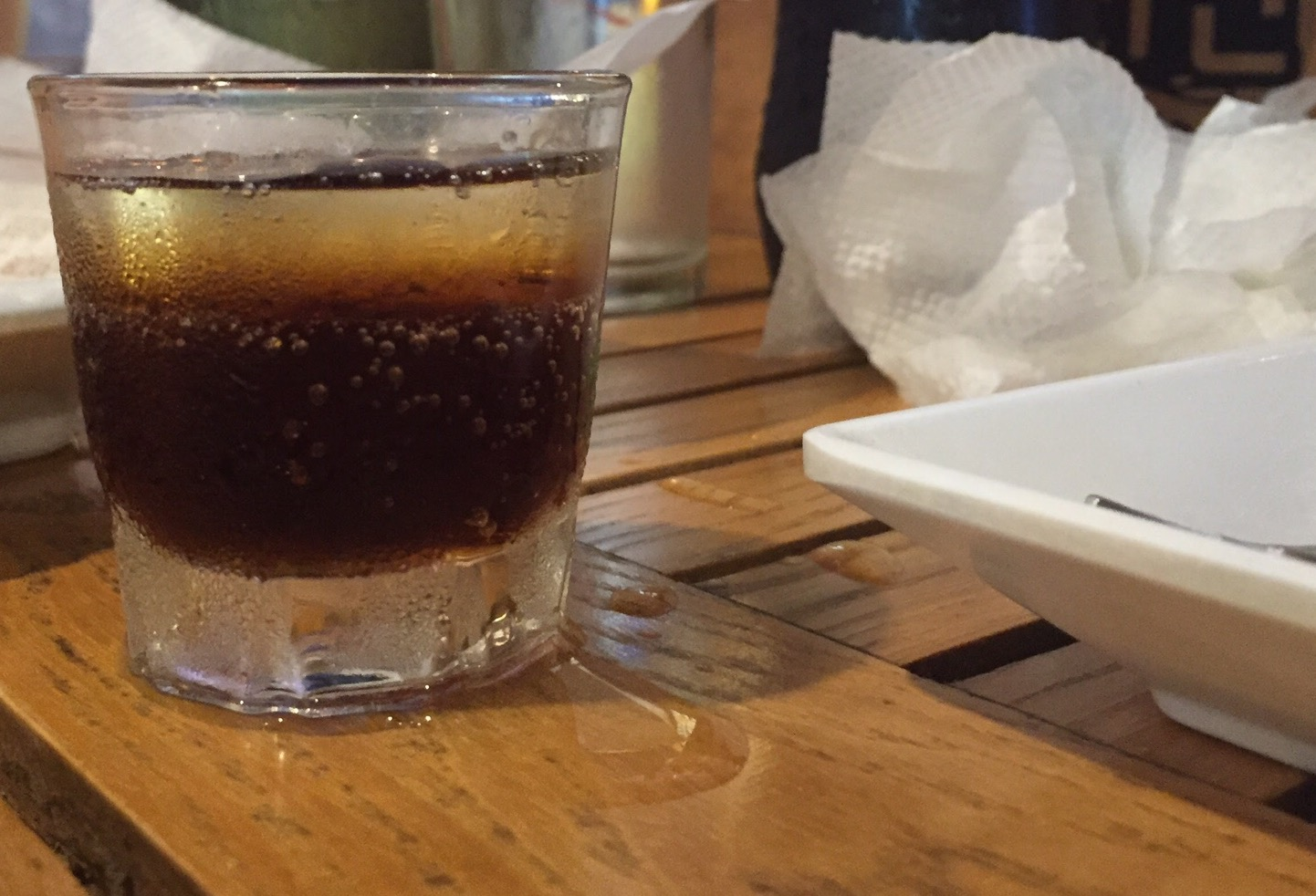
A "soju cola" prepared by floating soju on top of cola with the aid of a napkin

While soju is traditionally consumed straight, a few cocktails and mixed drinks use soju as a base spirit. Beer and soju can be mixed to create somaek (소맥), a portmanteau of the words soju and maekju (맥주 beer). Flavored soju is also available. It is also popular to blend fruits with soju and to drink it in "slushy" form. Another very popular flavored soju is yogurt soju (요구르트 소주), which is a combination of soju, yogurt, and lemon lime soda.

A poktan-ju (폭탄주) ("bomb drink") consists of a shot glass of soju dropped into a pint of beer (similar to a boilermaker); it is drunk quickly. This is similar to the Japanese sake bomb.

== See also ==
- Andong soju from Andong region
- Awamori, of Okinawa
- Baijiu, of China
- Korean alcoholic beverages
- Korean beer
- Korean cuisine
- Lao khao, of Laos and Thailand
- Makgeolli, of Korea
- Rice wine
- Rượu đế, of Vietnam
- Sake, of Japan
- Shōchū, of Japan

== General and cited references ==
- Park, Hyunhee (2021). Soju: A Global History. Cambridge University Press. ISBN 9781108895774.
