= Chamisul =

Number one South Korean soju brand

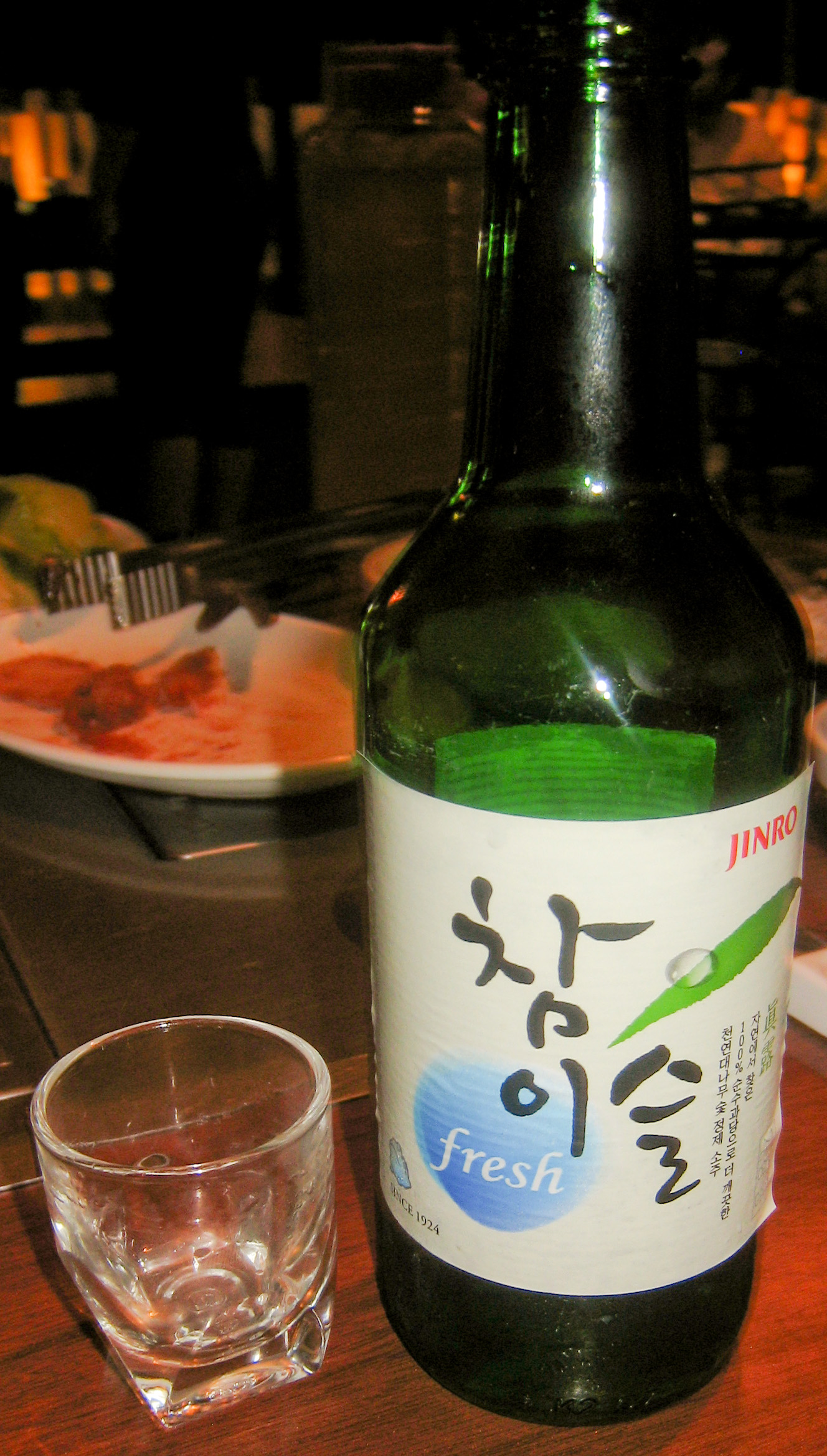
A bottle of Chamisul Fresh

Chamisul (Korean: 참이슬; lit. 'dew') is a brand of soju manufactured by South Korean company HiteJinro. In 2017, it was the most popular brand of distilled liquor in the world. It's still remained the most popular brand of distilled liquor in South Korea. Chamisul Original is 20.1% ABV, and Chamisul Fresh is 17% ABV.

It is available in 350mL/ 360mL/ 375mL/ and 750 mL bottles, and larger 1.8 L bottles as well.

== Etymology ==
The name "Chamisul", meaning "dew" in Korean, was created by Son Hye-won, the representative of Cross Point to represent the dew on the bottles of cold soju. It is also the Korean-reading of the hanja Jin-ro (眞露), the name of the company. First introduced in 1998 with its bamboo charcoal filter to remove impurities and making it have a rich taste.

== History ==
- October 9, 1998: Chamisul is launched by HiteJinro (then Jinro), offering a soju with a 23% ABV.
- February 2001: Lowered ABV to 22% and redesigned the logo. The trend of decreasing alcohol content continued, with the ABV dropping to 21% and then to 20.1%
- 2004: Jinro begins marketing Chamisul in Japan, expanding its international presence.
- February 2006: Lowered ABV to 20.1%.
- December 2009: Changed the logo and label.
- October 2012: Chamisul hires global superstar PSY to promote the product following the immense success of his hit song, "Gangnam Style."
- 2017: Chamisul (17.8% ABV), Chamisul CLASSIC (20.1% ABV) renewal. The name of Chamisul Classic is changed to Chamisul Original.
- April 2018: Chamisul Fresh (17.2% ABV) renewal.
- March 2019: Chamisul Fresh (17% ABV) renewal.
- July 2021: Chamisul is recognized as the most preferred soju brand in South Korea.

== Popularity: Soju in Korean Popular Culture ==
Soju, a clear distilled spirit native to Korea, holds a prominent place in the nation's culture, but no other brand is more iconic than Chamisul. Since 2014, soju has dominated the South Korean alcoholic beverage market, with Chamisul consistently leading in sales. This is partially due to its affordability and mass appeal, making it the top choice in consumer surveys across the country.

Chamisul's global recognition has been significantly bolstered by its frequent appearances in popular media, most notably in K-dramas, where its iconic green bottle has become a familiar sight.

A pivotal moment in the brand's marketing history occurred when global music sensation PSY, famous for "Gangnam Style," was seen chugging a bottle on stage. This spontaneous act led to endorsement deal with Jinro, with PSY starring in several promotional campaigns and YouTube videos for Chamisul. This collaboration further amplified the brand's visibility and popularity, solidifying its position not just as a drink, but as a symbol of Korean social life and entertainment.

== Chamisul Fresh ==
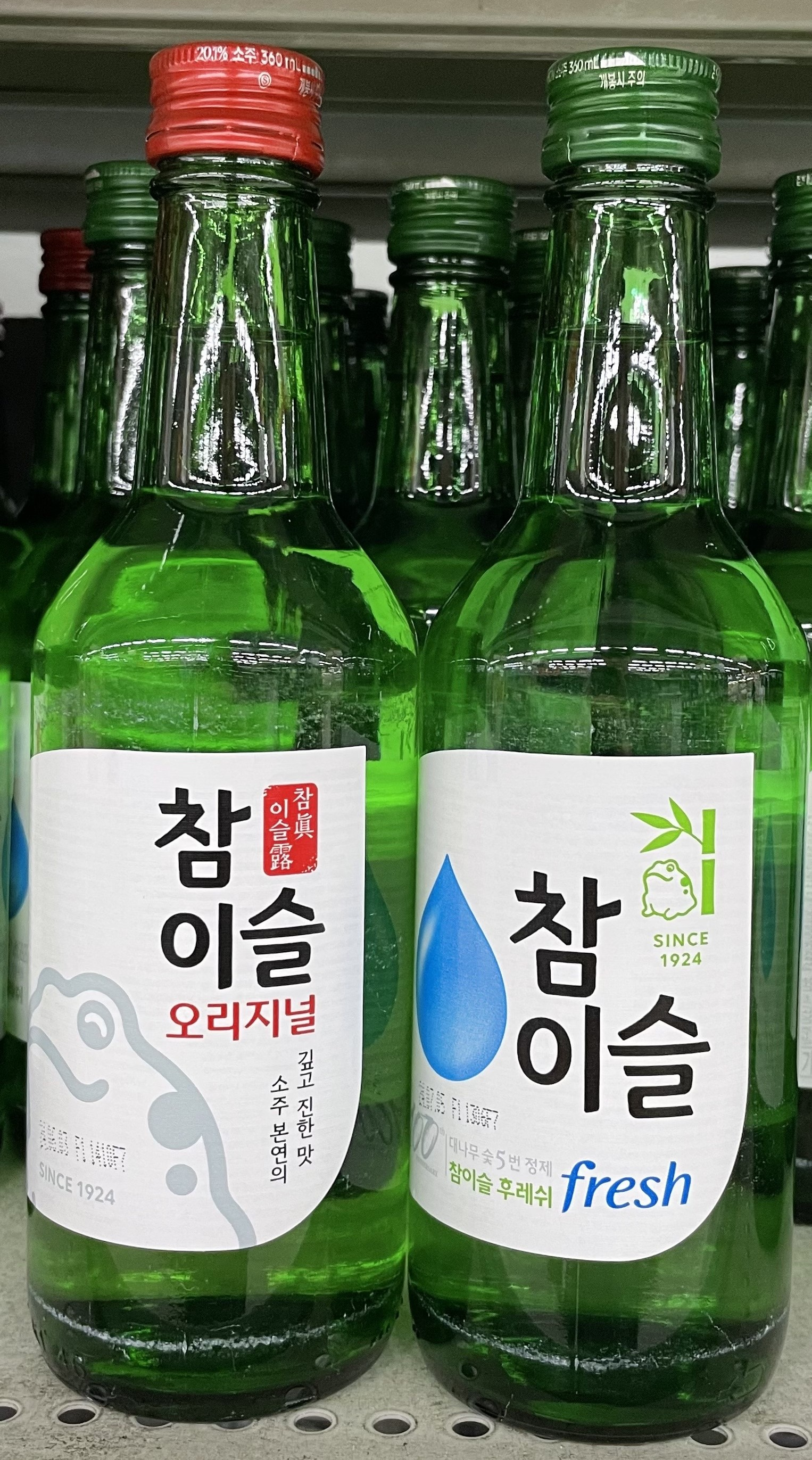
Chamisul Original and Chamisul Fresh

Jinro's Chamisul Fresh is a popular soju variant distinguished by its reduced alcohol content, catering to a modern consumer preference for milder spirits. On 9 April 2018, it was announced that the alcohol content will be lowered from 17.8% to 17.2% ABV starting April 16, 2018. From March 18, 2019, it was lowered again to 17% ABV. After the introduction of Chamisul Fresh on August 18, 2006, the brand was called both "Chamjinisulro" and "Chamisul." In December 2009, it was decided that "Chamisul" would be the sole name. These strategic changes made Chamisul Fresh HiteJinro's flagship soju. Its lighter and smoother profile has since established it as the most widely consumed soju not only in its home country of South Korea but also in markets around the world.

== Chamisul Original ==
Jinro's Chamisul Classic is a soju derivative that closely mirrors the flavor profile of the original Jinro soju. With an alcohol by volume (ABV) of 20.1%, it presents a more potent and robust taste than its modern counterparts. The spirit's deep, thick flavor is often sought after by those who prefer the traditional, more alcoholic style of soju. On 11 September 2017, the product was renamed Chamisul Original to better reflect its status as a tribute to the classic soju experience.
