= HiteJinro =

South Korean beverage company

HiteJinro Co., Ltd.
- Native name: 하이트진로
- Type: Public
- Traded as: KRX: 000080
- ISIN: KR7000141002; KR7000140004
- Industry: Beverage
- Founded: October 3, 1924 (102 years ago)
- Headquarters: HiteJinro Building; 714 Yeongdong-daero, Gangnam District, Seoul, South Korea
- Area served: Worldwide
- Key people: Kim In-Kyu (President and CEO); Park Moon-Deuk (Chairman)
- Products: Soju; Beer; Whisky; Wine; Bottled water
- Brands: Chamisul; Hite
- Parent: Hite Holdings Co., Ltd. (50.86%)
- Website: en.hitejinro.com

HiteJinro Co., Ltd. (Korean: 하이트진로; Hanja: 眞露; pronounced [tɕil.lo]) is a South Korean multinational drink, brewing and distilling company, founded in 1924. It is the world's leading producer of soju, accounting for more than half of that beverage's domestic sales. It also manufactures a variety of other alcoholic beverages, including red wine and whiskey. Distilleries are located in Icheon, Cheongwon, and Masan, with the Masan plant geared toward exports. In addition, Jinro produces the Soksu brand of bottled water at a factory in Cheongwon. In 2006, the company was acquired by Hite, a popular beverage company whose main product is beer.

Jinro soju is known by the brand name Chamisul (참이슬), which is the world's most popular liquor. Part of their marketing strategy is to use temperature-sensitive paper on their bottle label. A tab in the shape of an Asiatic Toad (the company's mascot) is white when the bottle is warm and becomes blue when the bottle is cold, indicating that the soju is ready to drink.

Jinro was named the top-selling spirit in the world in the Millionaires' Club 2016, after selling 73.8m 9-litre bottles in the year 2015.

== Products ==
=== Beer ===
- Terra
- Hite (Hite EXTRA COLD)
- Max
- Dry Finish D
- Stout
- Exfeel S
- Filite
- Queen's Ale – Blonde Type
- Queen's Ale – Extra Bitter Type

=== Soju ===
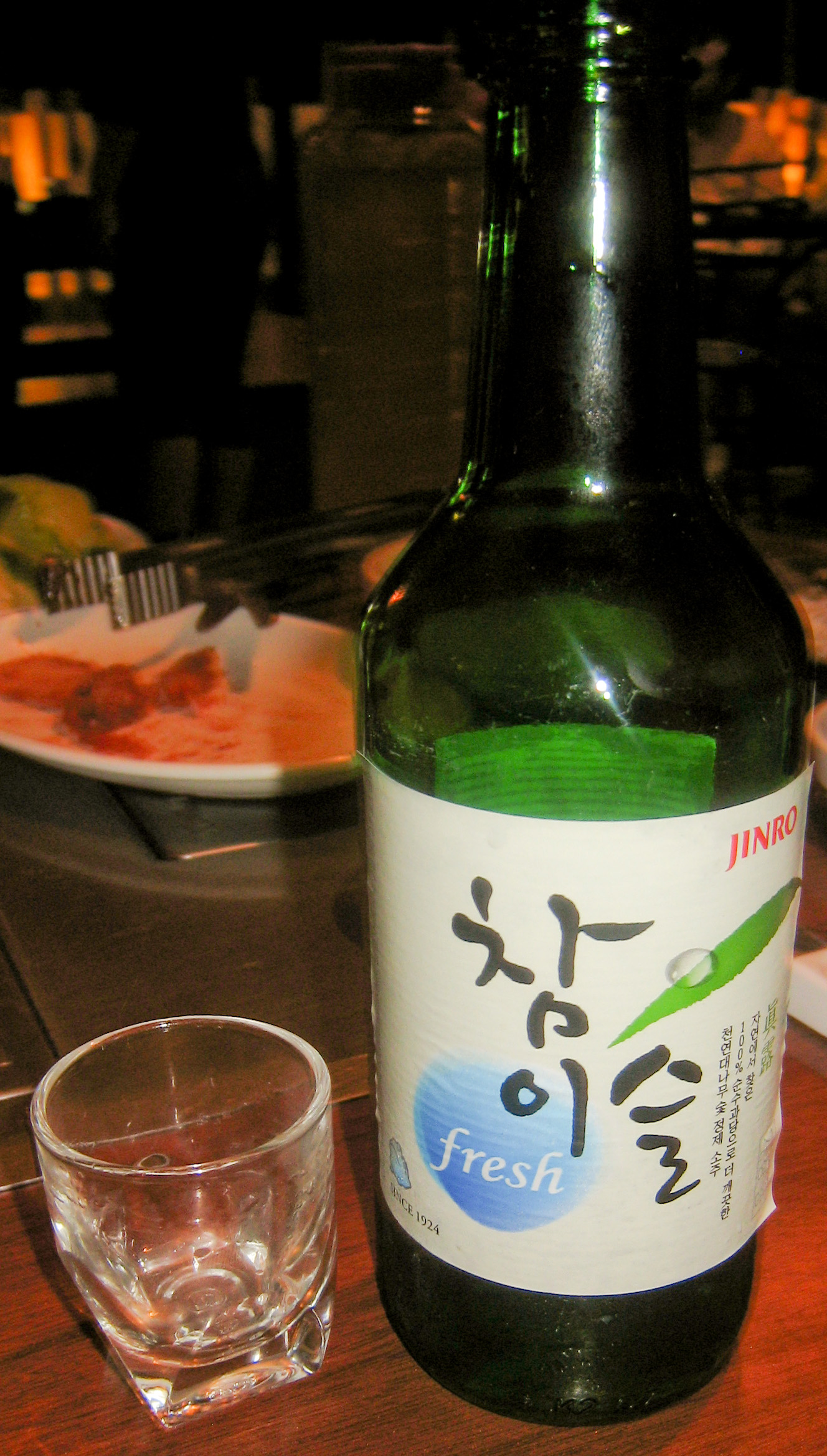
A bottle of Chamisul soju.

Jinro is the largest manufacturer of soju, accounting for half of all white spirits sold in South Korea. Soju accounts for 97% of the category. Global sales in 2013 were 750 million bottles; the second-largest spirits brand, Smirnoff, sold less than half that number. The most popular variety of soju is currently Chamisul (참이슬 - literally meaning "real dew"), a quadruple-filtered soju produced by Jinro. Other brands include:

- Chamisul Classic
- Chamisul Nature
- IlpumJinro
- JINRO GOLD
- Chamisul Damgeumjoo
- chamisul fresh
- jinro 24
- chamisul grapefruit
- chamisul green grape
- chamisul plum
- jinro tok-tok sparkling soju peach
- jinro tok-tok sparkling soju pineapple

=== Whiskey ===
- Kingdom
- Cutty Sark

=== Wine ===
- HiteJinro wine

=== Subsidiary brands ===
- Seoksu natural mineral water
- Puriss

== Success of Chamisul & Chamisul Fresh ==
Jinro launched Chamisul in South Korea on October 19, 1998. Their goal with the new brand was to break the stereotype that soju had to be 25% ABV to be palatable. The success of the brand changed the image of soju from a strong, hearty spirit to a "soft and clean" one. The name Chamisul has been commonly associated with soju ever since, and its introduction marked a historic breakthrough in the soju market, in terms of its quality, brand power, and sales volume. Chamisul was initially launched as a 23% ABV product when it was released. It has subsequently been revised to 20.1% ABV, while its sister sub-branding "Chamisul Fresh" is sold at 17.2% ABV. These two brands are currently leading the domestic soju market.

The brand has gained huge popularity by using the bamboo charcoal filtration method since its launch. The recipe has also been renewed seven times since.

Chamisul has become a common place word for soju in South Korea. The brand has been holding a 50% (or more) share of the domestic market for two years after its initial release.

== Impact on Korean drinking culture ==
Hitejinro's product line includes six beers, most notably the Hite label; seven soju lines, including the Korean favourite, Chamisul; two whiskey variations; and one wine. Together, this has garnered them a sizeable market share. Hite Brewery Co., Ltd. is the leading player in the Korean alcoholic drinks market, generating a 50.2% share. (Note: Alcoholic Drinks Industry Profile: South Korea, 1-28 (2014, Ahn Dae-hwan))

Jinro's brand of soju is the biggest-selling spirit in the world, according to a survey by the UK-based Drinks International magazine, easily outselling vodka and whisky brands last year. (Note: Soju: The New Vodka (4 Oct 2004, Kate Bonamici, Fortune))

Average adult annual consumption of spirits in South Korea is 9.57 litres, the world's highest, according to 2005 data from the World Health Organisation published last year. The Korean landscape of drinking has resulted in numerous street brawls, increased family violence and other crimes involving drinking. This prevalent problem is further exacerbated due to very minimal government punishment when a crime is committed while under the influence of alcohol.

Due to these occurrences, Hite-Jinro has begun putting warning labels on bottles of Chamisul and Beer products with messages reading: "No more drunken violence! Let's improve the wrong drinking culture!" (Note: South Korea: Let's Improve Wrong Drinking Culture! (12 Jul 2012, May Wilkerson, TheFix.com))

"We felt tremendously responsible for social problems caused by drinking... we will help with efforts to change our drinking culture to a more positive one," said a sales manager at Hite-Jinro, quoted in Chosun Ilbo newspaper.

== Expansion outside Korea ==
The increased sales of Soju have led foreign investors to consider acquisitions within the South Korean spirits industry. However, an international firm faces significant competition from a domestic manufacturer.

With HiteJinro's most notable drink, Soju, it has quickly gained momentum and popularity as a vodka substitute. The spirit, which is distilled from rice, barley, and koji, has become a popular import; though, with the company operating in Russia, the US, South Korea, China and Japan, the Korean giant has begun setting its sights on India with a new bottling deal. (Note: Korean soju giant inks India bottling deal (29 Apr 2013, Boby Kurian & Anshul Dhamija, The Times of India))

Monika Alcobev Limited, an Indian business, announced its collaboration with HiteJinro in December 2025. Monika Alcobev would take over full ownership for the import, distribution, and marketing of Soju in key Indian cities. After starting in Delhi, Haryana, Chandigarh, Uttar Pradesh, Mumbai, Bengaluru, Hyderabad, and Goa, the rollout will extend to Tier 1 and Tier 2 cities. Popular Soju varieties like Chamisul Fresh, Green Grape, Plum, Strawberry, and Peach will be included in the launch. The Korean wave is popularising the culture of soju consumption.

== See also ==
- Economy of South Korea
