= Xuezhikang =

Traditional Chinese medicine formulation

Xuezhikang (Chinese: 血脂康; pinyin: xuè zhī kāng) is a traditional Chinese medicine formulation used for the treatment of hyperlipidemia and cardiovascular diseases. It is a partially purified extract of red yeast rice and contains a mixture of naturally occurring statins, including monacolin K, which is chemically identical to lovastatin. In clinical practice, xuezhikang is often considered a "natural polypill" due to its diverse lipid-lowering and cardiovascular protective components.

== Composition ==
Xuezhikang is a modern therapeutic agent derived from red yeast rice, a traditional Chinese food and medicinal product made by fermenting rice with Monascus purpureus yeast. It was developed to retain a complex mixture of bioactive components including at least 13 types of monacolins, unsaturated fatty acids, ergosterol, flavonoids, alkaloids, amino acids, and trace elements. Each 1,200 mg capsule typically contains around 10 mg of monacolin K. This complex composition is believed to contribute to its multi-targeted pharmacological effects. This combination contributes to its characterization as a "natural polypill", potentially offering multiple cardiovascular benefits through synergistic mechanisms.

== History and traditional uses ==
The use of red yeast rice in China dates back over two millennia. It was first recorded in the gazetteer Local Chronicles of Gutian (Chinese: 古田县志; pinyin: Gǔtián Xiànzhì), written during the Tang dynasty (618–907 AD) and since then was documented in many classical medical texts such as Qing Yi Lu (c. 907–1127), Materia Medica in Daily (c. 1271–1368) and Compendium of Materia Medica (1578). Other historical records from the Tang dynasty describe its medicinal applications, particularly for promoting blood circulation and improving digestion. In addition to its role in traditional medicine, red yeast rice has long been consumed as a coloring and flavoring agent in foods. Red yeast rice is found in over 155 traditional Chinese healthy foods and preparations.

During fermentation, Monascus purpureus produces a variety of bioactive compounds, including a family of polyketides known as monacolins. Among these, monacolin K is chemically identical to lovastatin, a cholesterol-lowering statin first isolated independently from Aspergillus terreus in Western pharmaceutical research. This structural similarity provided the scientific basis for the modern medical interest in red yeast rice and led to the development of xuezhikang as a standardized extract.

Xuezhikang is typically prescribed for the treatment of hyperlipidemia and the secondary prevention of cardiovascular diseases. In traditional Chinese medicine (TCM), red yeast rice is considered mild in nature, slightly sweet, and non-toxic. It is believed to act on the liver, spleen, and large intestine meridians. Red yeast rice was commonly used to treat conditions such as indigestion, diarrhea, fatigue, and limb weakness, and was sometimes recommended as part of the diet for individuals with heart-related ailments.

The clinical development of xuezhikang has included large-scale, randomized controlled trials to evaluate its efficacy and safety. The most notable among these is the China Coronary Secondary Prevention Study (CCSPS), a multicenter trial involving nearly 5,000 patients with a history of myocardial infarction. The study demonstrated that long-term treatment with xuezhikang significantly reduced the risk of recurrent coronary events and cardiovascular mortality, while improving lipid profiles and showing good tolerability. This trial represented the first large-scale secondary prevention study of its kind in an East Asian population and drew comparisons with landmark Western studies such as the CARE trial.

== Mechanism of action ==
The primary mechanism involves inhibition of HMG-CoA reductase, the rate-limiting enzyme in hepatic cholesterol synthesis. This statin-like effect, mainly attributable to monacolin K, leads to decreased intracellular cholesterol production and upregulation of LDL receptors, thereby enhancing clearance of circulating LDL cholesterol.

Xuezhikang affects broader aspects of cholesterol metabolism. It significantly reduces serum levels of intermediate sterols such as squalene, dehydrocholesterol, and lathosterol, which are biomarkers of cholesterol biosynthesis. While it may also reduce cholesterol absorption markers like campesterol, stigmasterol, and sitosterol, these effects have been less consistently significant. Non-statin constituents, such as flavonoids and ergosterol, may contribute to these broader metabolic effects.

Xuezhikang also possesses anti-inflammatory properties. It has been shown to lower circulating levels of high-sensitivity C-reactive protein (hs-CRP) and interleukin 6 (IL-6), biomarkers of systemic inflammation. In animal models, it downregulates hepatic tumor necrosis factor (TNF) mRNA expression, which may account for its hepatoprotective effects. These anti-inflammatory actions have been associated with improved endothelial function, as measured by enhanced flow-mediated dilation (FMD), and may also be secondary to reductions in postprandial triglyceride levels.

== Administration ==
Xuezhikang is administered orally as capsules. The most commonly used dosage in clinical trials and routine practice is 600 mg taken twice daily (BID), amounting to a total daily dose of 1,200 mg. The dosage may vary depending on the clinical indication, patient response, and specific trial design, but 1,200 mg/day remains the most frequently studied and widely recommended regimen in contemporary clinical practice.

Some studies have explored alternative dosing regimens. In certain trials, patients initially received 600 mg once daily (QD), with adjustments based on lipid profile responses. If serum total cholesterol or triglyceride levels remained elevated after six weeks, the dose was increased to 600 mg three times daily (TID). Other trials have used regimens such as 300 mg TID or 1,200 mg once nightly (QN), although these are less common.

== Safety ==
Xuezhikang has been used in clinical practice for decades with a generally favorable safety profile. Adverse effects, such as gastrointestinal discomfort, headache, dizziness, and skin irritation, are typically mild. However, these effects are typically mild and occur at rates similar to control groups. A systematic review found no significant increase in the risk of hepatotoxicity, myopathy, or renal impairment with red yeast rice use. Moreover, patients with statin intolerance have been shown to tolerate xuezhikang or other red yeast rice preparations, likely due to their lower monacolin content. Meta-analyses and randomized studies have reported that red yeast rice has a tolerability profile comparable to placebo and standard statin therapy, with no significant increase in the incidence of adverse events.

Although monacolin K is structurally identical to lovastatin, xuezhikang contains it in relatively low concentrations and within a complex matrix of other compounds. This composition may modulate its safety profile. For example, animal studies have indicated hepatoprotective effects of xuezhikang compared to drugs like fenofibrate. Additionally, no consistent depletion of coenzyme Q10 (CoQ10) has been observed, though some studies suggest supplementation may still be prudent. Xuezhikang has been found to be safe in elderly populations, including hypertensive patients and those with a history of myocardial infarction.
