= Mold =

Wooly, dust-like fungal structure or substance

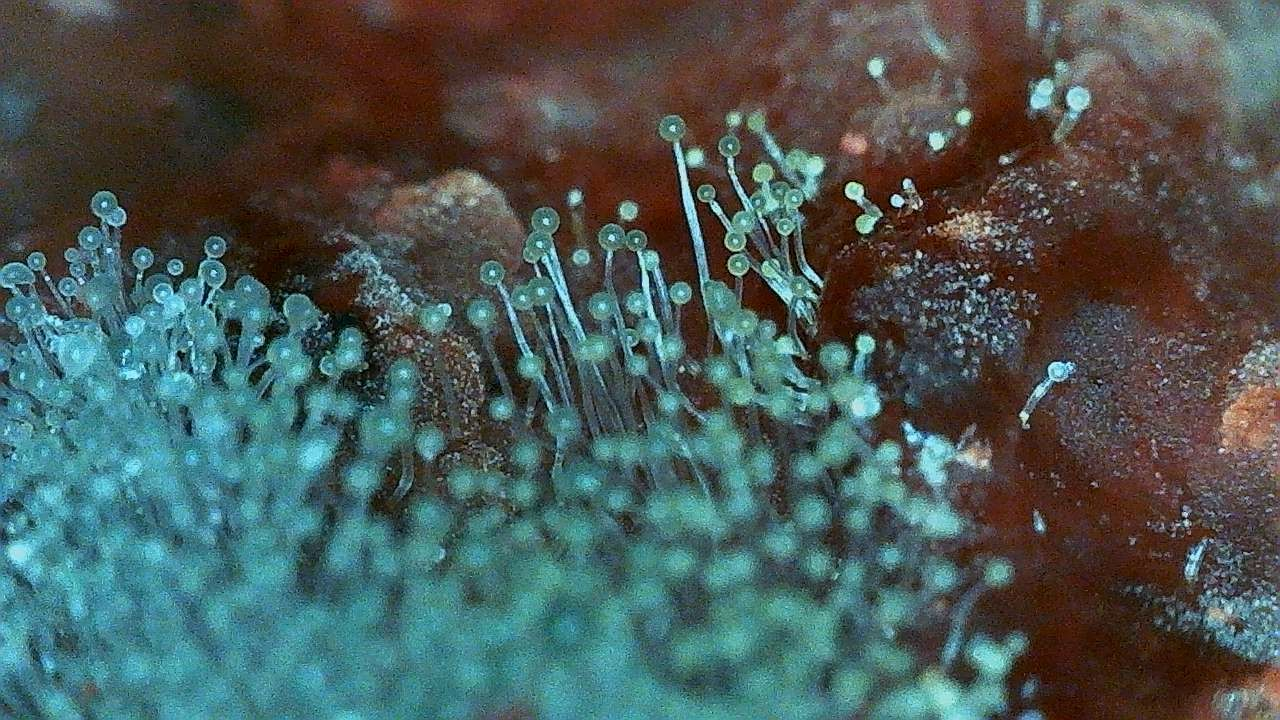
Close up of mold on a strawberry

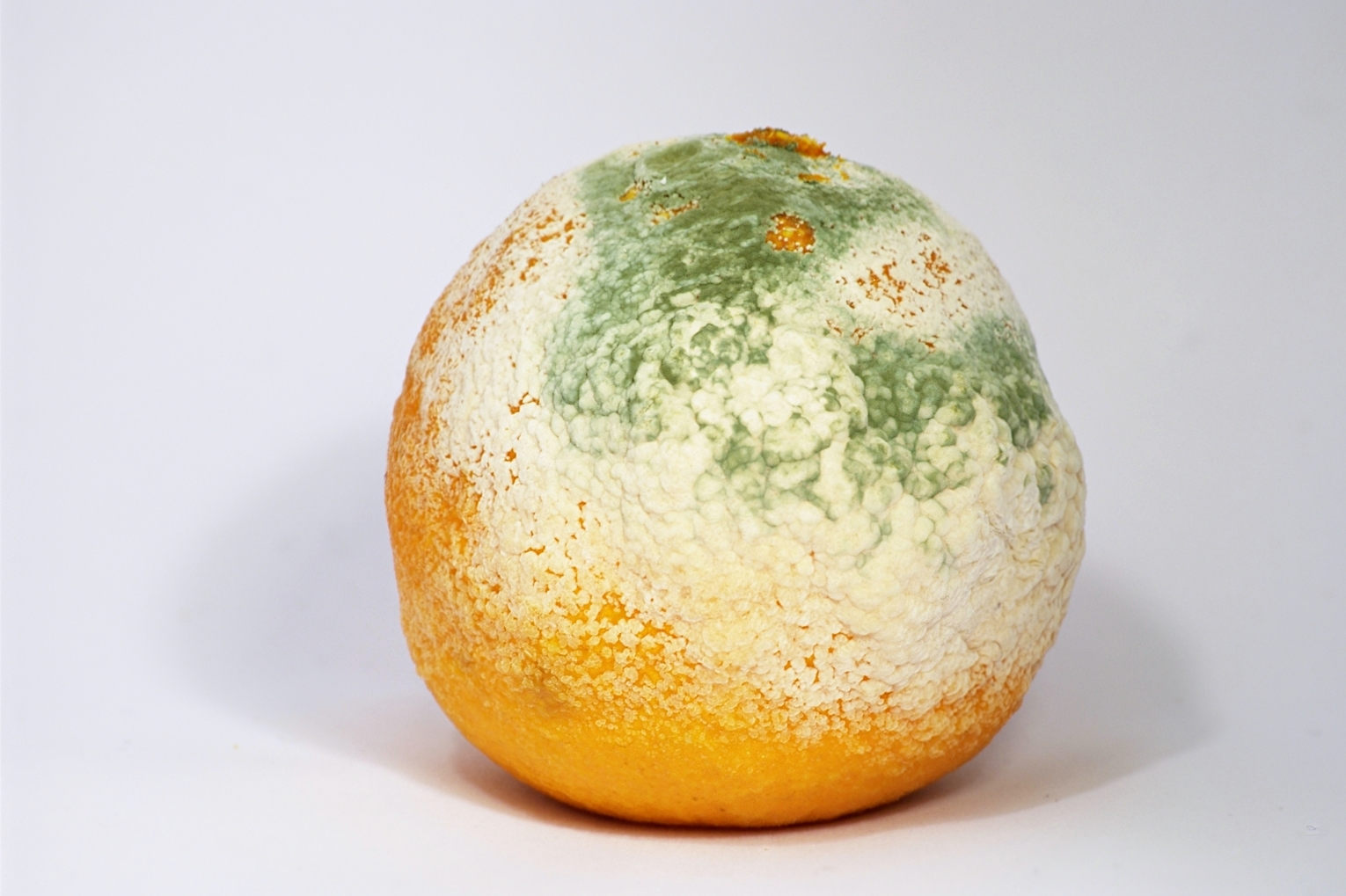
Penicillium digitatum mold growing on a clementine

A mold (US, PH) or mould (UK, CW) is one of the structures that certain fungi can form. The dust-like, colored appearance of molds is due to the formation of spores containing fungal secondary metabolites. The spores are the dispersal units of the fungi. Not all fungi form molds. Some fungi form mushrooms or ascomata; others grow as single cells and are called yeasts.

A large and taxonomically diverse number of fungal species form molds. The growth of hyphae results in discoloration and a fuzzy appearance, especially on food. The network of these tubular branching hyphae, called a mycelium, is considered a single organism. The hyphae are generally transparent, so the mycelium appears like very fine, fluffy white threads over the surface. Cross-walls (septa) may delimit connected compartments along the hyphae, each containing one or multiple, genetically identical nuclei. The dusty texture of many molds is caused by profuse production of asexual spores (conidia) formed by differentiation at the ends of hyphae. The mode of formation and shape of these spores is traditionally used to classify molds. Many of these spores are colored, making the fungus much more obvious to the human eye at this stage in its life-cycle.

Molds are microbes that do not form a specific taxonomic or phylogenetic grouping, but can be found in the divisions Zygomycota and Ascomycota. In the past, most molds were classified within the Deuteromycota. Mold was the common name for water molds or slime molds, which were formerly classified as fungi.

Molds cause biodegradation of natural materials, which can be unwanted when it becomes food spoilage or damage to property. They also play important roles in biotechnology and food science in the production of various pigments, foods, beverages, antibiotics, pharmaceuticals and enzymes. Some diseases of animals and humans can be caused by certain molds: disease may result from allergic sensitivity to mold spores, from growth of pathogenic molds within the body, or from the effects of ingested or inhaled toxic compounds (mycotoxins) produced by molds.

== Biology ==
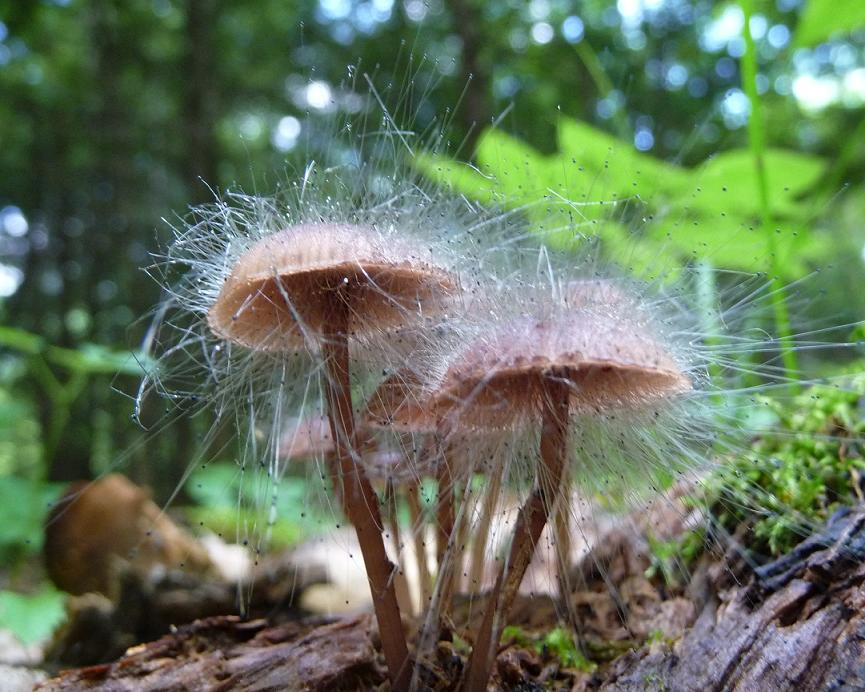
Spinellus fusiger growing on the mushroom Mycena haematopus

There are thousands of known species of mold fungi with diverse life-styles including saprotrophs, mesophiles, psychrophiles and thermophiles, and a very few opportunistic pathogens of humans. They all require moisture for growth and some live in aquatic environments. Like all fungi, molds derive energy not through photosynthesis but from the organic matter on which they live, utilizing heterotrophy. Typically, molds secrete hydrolytic enzymes, mainly from the hyphal tips. These enzymes degrade complex biopolymers such as starch, cellulose, and lignin into simpler substances that can be absorbed by the hyphae. In this way, molds play a major role in the decomposition of organic material, enabling the recycling of nutrients throughout ecosystems. Many molds also synthesize mycotoxins and siderophores that, together with lytic enzymes, inhibit the growth of competing microorganisms. Molds can also grow on stored food for animals and humans, making the food unpalatable or toxic, and are thus a major source of food losses and illness. Many strategies for food preservation (salting, pickling, jams, bottling, freezing, drying) are intended to prevent or slow mold growth as well as the growth of other microbes.

Molds reproduce by producing large numbers of small spores, that may contain a single nucleus or be multinucleate. Mold spores can be asexual (the products of mitosis) or sexual (the products of meiosis); many species can produce both types. Some molds produce small, hydrophobic spores that are adapted for wind dispersal and may remain airborne for long periods; in some the cell walls are darkly pigmented, providing resistance to damage by ultraviolet radiation. Other mold spores have slimy sheaths and are more suited to water dispersal. Mold spores are often spherical or ovoid single cells, but can be multicellular and variously shaped. Spores may cling to clothing or fur; some are able to survive extremes of temperature and pressure.

Although molds can grow on dead organic matter everywhere in nature, their presence is visible to the unaided eye only when they form large colonies. A mold colony does not consist of discrete organisms but is an interconnected network of hyphae called a mycelium. All growth occurs at hyphal tips, with cytoplasm and organelles flowing forwards as the hyphae advance over or through new food sources. Nutrients are absorbed at the hyphal tip. In artificial environments such as buildings, humidity and temperature are often stable enough to foster the growth of mold colonies, which are often visible as a downy or furry coating growing on food or other surfaces.

Few molds can begin growing at temperatures of 4 °C (39 °F) or below, so food is typically refrigerated to this temperature. When conditions do not enable growth to take place, molds can remain alive in a dormant state within a large range of temperatures that depends on the species. The many different mold species vary enormously in their tolerance for temperature and humidity extremes. Certain molds can survive harsh conditions such as the snow-covered soils of Antarctica, refrigeration, highly acidic solvents, anti-bacterial soap, and even petroleum products such as jet fuel.

Xerophilic molds are able to grow in relatively dry, salty, or sugary environments, where water activity (a_{w}) is less than 0.85; other molds need more moisture.

== Common molds ==
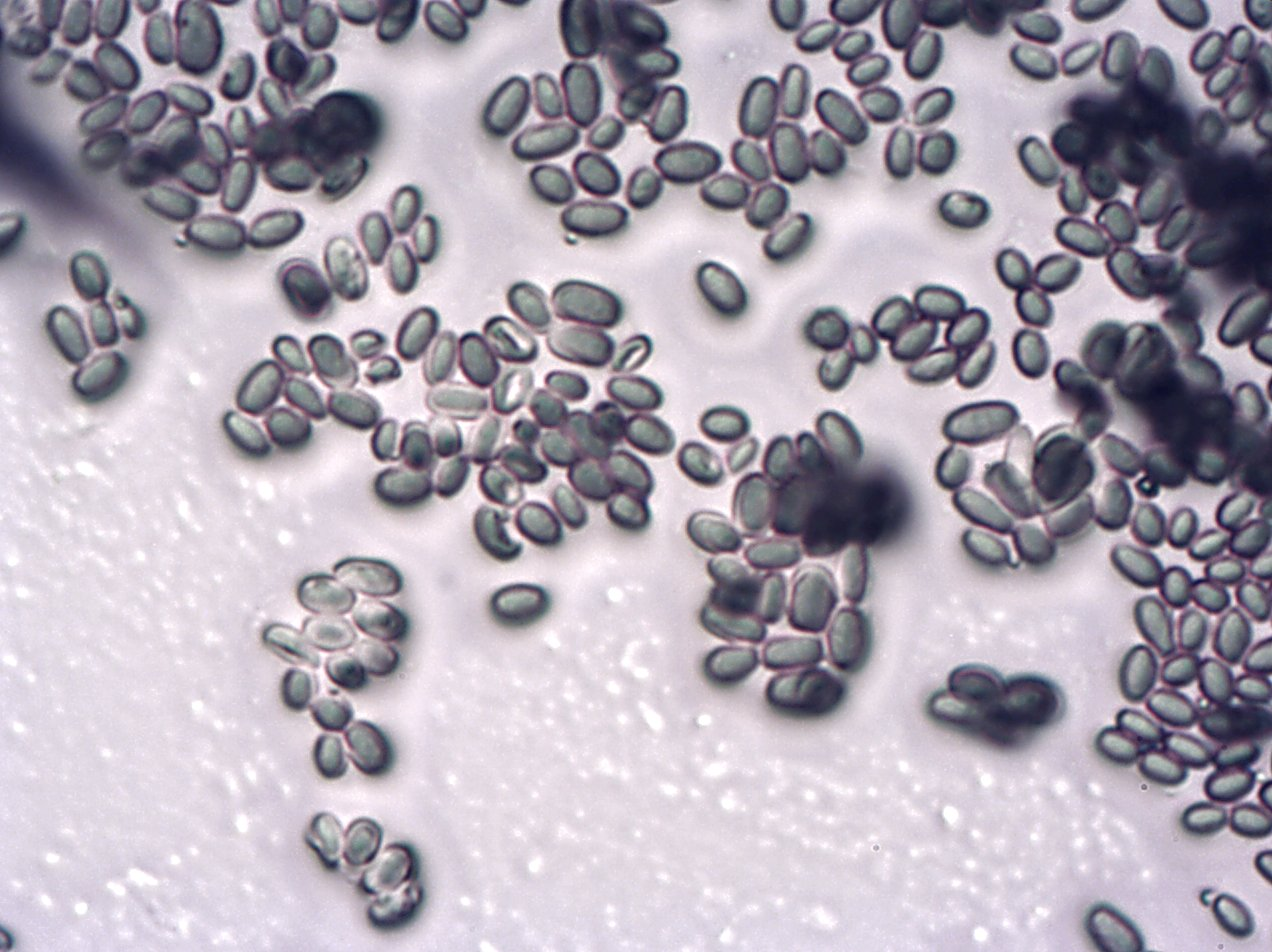
Spores from green mold (Penicillium or Trichoderma) growing on an orange, 1000× wet mount

Common genera of molds include:

- Acremonium
- Alternaria
- Aspergillus
- Cladosporium
- Fusarium
- Mucor
- Penicillium
- Rhizopus
- Stachybotrys
- Trichoderma
- Trichophyton

== Food production ==
The Kōji molds are a group of Aspergillus species, notably Aspergillus oryzae, and secondarily A. sojae, that have been cultured in eastern Asia for many centuries. They are used to ferment a soybean and wheat mixture to make soybean paste and soy sauce. Koji molds break down the starch in rice, barley, sweet potatoes, etc., a process called saccharification, in the production of sake, shōchū and other distilled spirits. Koji molds are also used in the preparation of Katsuobushi.

Red rice yeast is a product of the mold Monascus purpureus grown on rice, and is common in Asian diets especially Chinese ones, The yeast contains several compounds collectively known as monacolins, which are known to inhibit cholesterol synthesis. A study has shown that red rice yeast used as a dietary supplement, combined with fish oil and healthy lifestyle changes, may help reduce "bad" cholesterol as effectively as certain commercial statin drugs. Nonetheless, other work has shown it may not be reliable (perhaps due to non-standardization) and even toxic to liver and kidneys.

Some sausages, such as salami, incorporate starter cultures of molds to improve flavor and reduce bacterial spoilage during curing. Penicillium nalgiovense, for example, may appear as a powdery white coating on some varieties of dry-cured sausage (e.g., European-style dry-cured sausages, especially Southern European traditions of it).

Other molds that have been used in food production include:

- Fusarium venenatum – quorn
- Geotrichum candidum – cheese
- Neurospora sitophila – oncom
- Penicillium spp. – various cheeses including Brie and Blue cheese
- Rhizomucor miehei – microbial rennet for making vegetarian and other cheeses
- Rhizopus oligosporus – tempeh
- Rhizopus oryzae – tempeh, jiuqu for jiuniang or precursor for making Chinese rice wine

== Pharmaceuticals from molds ==
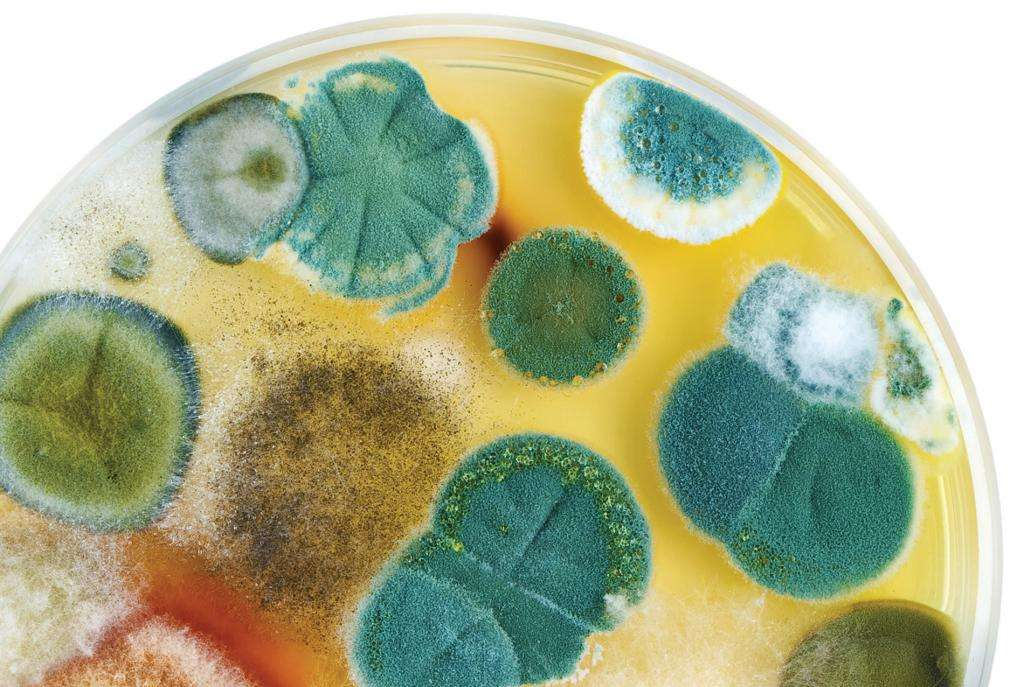
Molds on a Petri dish

Alexander Fleming's accidental discovery of the antibiotic penicillin involved a Penicillium mold then called Penicillium rubrum (although the species was later established to be Penicillium rubens). Fleming continued to investigate penicillin, showing that it could inhibit various types of bacteria found in infections and other ailments, but he was unable to produce the compound in amounts large enough for the production of a medicine. His work was expanded by a team at Oxford University: Clutterbuck, Lovell, and Raistrick, who began to work on the problem in 1931. This team was also unable to produce the pure compound in large amounts, and found that the purification process diminished its effectiveness and negated its anti-bacterial properties.

Howard Florey, Ernst Chain, Norman Heatley, Edward Abraham, also all at Oxford, continued the work. They enhanced and developed the concentration technique by using organic solutions rather than water, and created the "Oxford Unit" to measure penicillin concentration within a solution. They managed to purify the solution, increasing its concentration by 45–50 times, and found that a higher concentration was possible. Experiments were conducted and the results published in 1941, though the quantities of penicillin produced were not always high enough for the treatments required. As this was during the Second World War, Florey sought US government involvement. With research teams in the UK and some in the US, industrial-scale production of crystallized penicillin was developed during 1941–1944 by the USDA and by Pfizer.

Several statin cholesterol-lowering drugs (such as lovastatin, from Aspergillus terreus) are derived from molds.

The immunosuppressant drug cyclosporine, used to suppress the rejection of transplanted organs, is derived from the mold Tolypocladium inflatum.

== Health effects ==
Molds are ubiquitous, and mold spores are a common component of household and workplace dust; however, when mold spores are present in large quantities, they can present a health hazard to humans, potentially causing allergic reactions and respiratory problems.

Some molds also produce mycotoxins that can pose serious health risks to humans and animals. Some studies claim that exposure to high levels of mycotoxins can lead to neurological problems and, in some cases, death. Prolonged exposure, e.g., daily home exposure, may be particularly harmful. Research on the health impacts of mold has not been conclusive. The term "toxic mold" refers to molds that produce mycotoxins, such as Stachybotrys chartarum, and not to all molds in general.

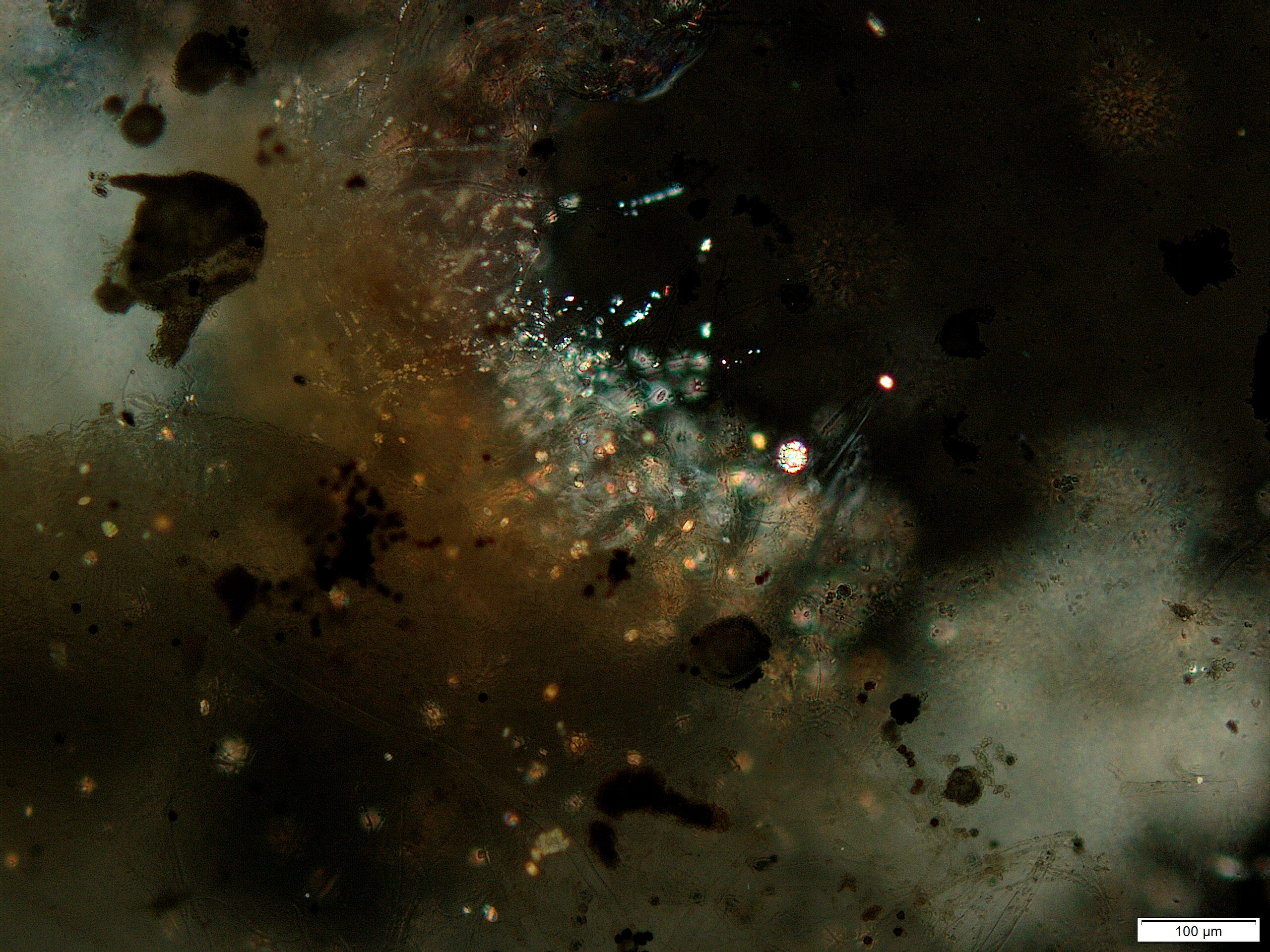
Mold (Aspergillus niger, A related Aspergillus section Nigri/Black aspergilli Species or Penicillium) on a grapefruit under the microscope

Molds can also pose a hazard to human and animal health when they are consumed following the growth of certain mold species in stored food. Some species produce toxic secondary metabolites, collectively termed mycotoxins, including aflatoxins, ochratoxins, fumonisins, trichothecenes, citrinin, and patulin. These toxic properties may be used for the benefit of humans when the toxicity is directed against other organisms; for example, penicillin adversely affects the growth of Gram-positive bacteria (e.g. Clostridium species), certain spirochetes and certain fungi.

== Growth in buildings and homes ==
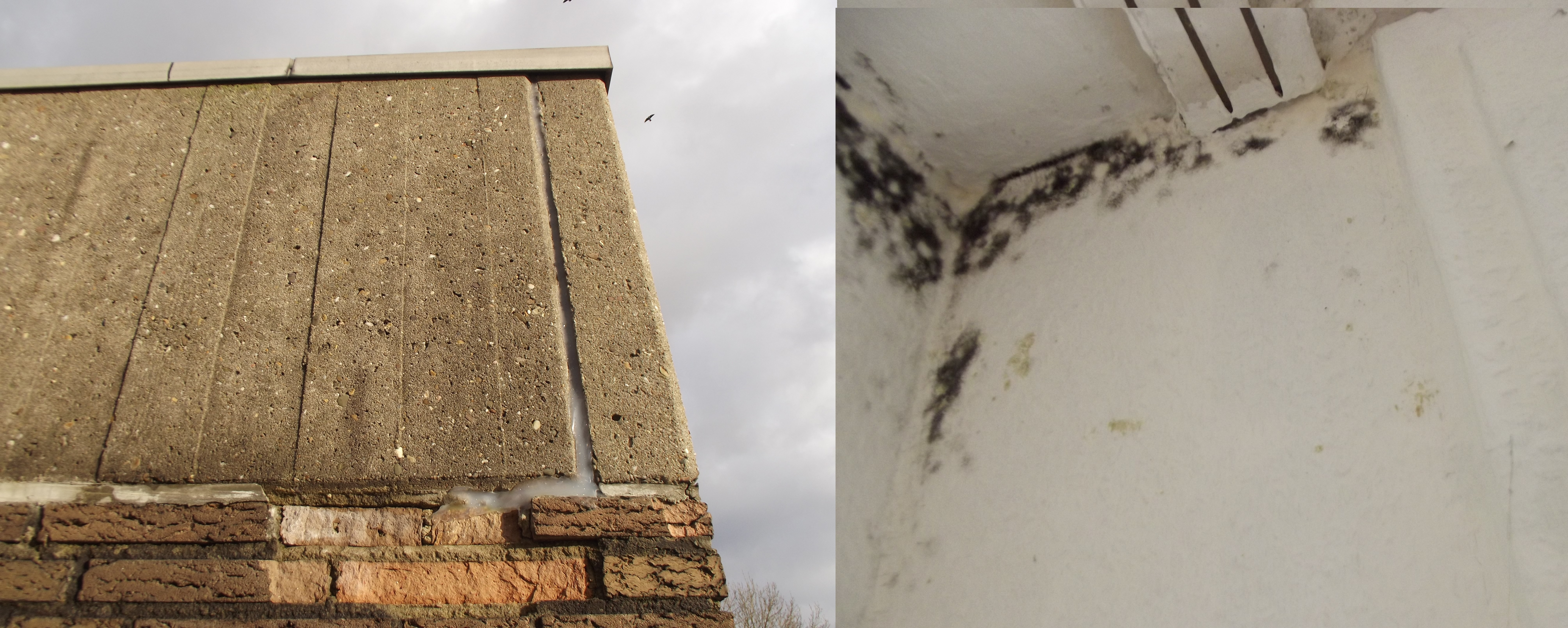
Moldy (Stachybotrys chartarum or a similar Species) housecorner from outside and inside

Mold growth in buildings generally occurs as fungi colonize porous building materials, such as wood. Many building products commonly incorporate paper, wood products, or solid wood members, such as paper-covered drywall, wood cabinets, and insulation. Interior mold colonization can lead to a variety of health problems as microscopic airborne reproductive spores, analogous to tree pollen, are inhaled by building occupants. High quantities of indoor airborne spores as compared to exterior conditions are strongly suggestive of indoor mold growth. Determination of airborne spore counts is accomplished by way of an air sample, in which a specialized pump with a known flow rate is operated for a known period of time. To account for background levels, air samples should be drawn from the affected area, a control area, and the exterior.

The air sampler pump draws in air and deposits microscopic airborne particles on a culture medium. The medium is cultured in a laboratory and the fungal genus and species are determined by visual microscopic observation. Laboratory results also quantify fungal growth by way of a spore count for comparison among samples. The pump operation time is recorded and when multiplied by pump flow rate results in a specific volume of air obtained. Although a small volume of air is actually analyzed, common laboratory reports extrapolate the spore count data to estimate spores that would be present in a cubic meter of air.

Mold spores are drawn to specific environments, making it easier for them to grow. These spores will usually only turn into a full-blown outbreak if certain conditions are met. Various practices can be followed to mitigate mold issues in buildings, the most important of which is to reduce moisture levels that can facilitate mold growth. Air filtration reduces the number of spores available for germination, especially when a High Efficiency Particulate Air (HEPA) filter is used. A properly functioning AC unit also reduces the relative humidity in rooms. The United States Environmental Protection Agency (EPA) currently recommends that relative humidity be maintained below 60%, ideally between 30% and 50%, to inhibit mold growth.

Eliminating the moisture source is the first step at fungal remediation. Removal of affected materials may also be necessary for remediation, if materials are easily replaceable and not part of the load-bearing structure. Professional drying of concealed wall cavities and enclosed spaces such as cabinet toekick spaces may be required. Post-remediation verification of moisture content and fungal growth is required for successful remediation. Many contractors perform post-remediation verification themselves, but property owners may benefit from independent verification. Left untreated, mold can potentially cause serious cosmetic and structural damage to a property.

== Use in art ==
Various artists have used mold in various artistic fashions. Daniele Del Nero, for example, constructs scale models of houses and office buildings and then induces mold to grow on them, giving them an unsettling, reclaimed-by-nature look. Stacy Levy sandblasts enlarged images of mold onto glass, then allows mold to grow in the crevasses she has made, creating a macro-micro portrait. Sam Taylor-Johnson has made a number of time-lapse films capturing the gradual decay of classically arranged still lifes.

== See also ==
- Bioaerosol – Airborne particles containing living organisms
- Decay – Process of breaking down organic matter
- Indoor mold – Interior fungal growth
- Medicinal fungi – Fungi that can be used to develop medications
- Mildew – Form of fungus
- Mold mite – Species of mite
- Mycorrhiza – Fungus-plant symbiotic association
- Oomycete – Fungus-like eukaryotic microorganism
- Slime mold
- Water mold
