= Akira Endo (biochemist) =

Japanese biochemist (1933–2024)

- 遠藤章
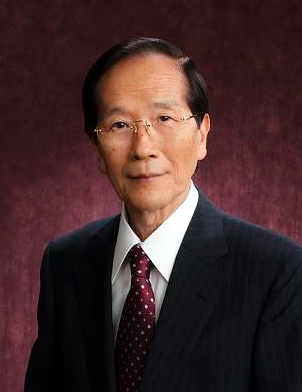
- Born: 14 November 1933; Higashiyuri, Japan (present-day Yurihonjō, Akita)
- Died: 5 June 2024 (aged 90)
- Education: Tohoku University
- Known for: Discovering the first statin (HMG-CoA reductase inhibitor), paving the way for statin drug development
- Awards: Heinrich Wieland Prize (1987); Japan Prize (2006); Massry Prize (2006); Lasker Award (2008); National Inventors Hall of Fame (2012); Canada Gairdner International Award (2017)
- Scientific career
- Fields: Biochemistry
- Workplaces: Sankyo Co., Tokyo University of Agriculture and Technology

Akira Endo (遠藤 章, Endō Akira; 14 November 1933 – 5 June 2024) was a Japanese biochemist whose research into the relationship between fungi and cholesterol biosynthesis led to the development of statin drugs, which are some of the best-selling pharmaceuticals in history.

Endo received the Japan Prize in 2006, the Lasker-DeBakey Clinical Medical Research Award in 2008, the Canada Gairdner International Award in 2017.

== Biography ==
Endo was born on a farm in Northern Japan and had an interest in fungi already at a young age, being an admirer of Alexander Fleming. He obtained a BA at Tohoku University (Faculty of Agriculture) in Sendai in 1957 and a PhD in biochemistry at the same university in 1966.

Endo died of pneumonia on 5 June 2024, at the age of 90.

== Career ==
From 1957 to 1978 he worked as a research fellow at chemical company Sankyo Co.; initially he worked on fungal enzymes for processing fruit juice. Successful discoveries in this field gained him the credit to move to New York City in 1966, and spend two years at the Albert Einstein College of Medicine as a research associate working on enzymes and cholesterol.

His most important work in the 1970s was on fungal extrolites and their influence on cholesterol synthesis. He hypothesised that fungi used chemicals to ward off parasitic organisms by inhibiting cholesterol synthesis. The cell membranes of fungi contain ergosterol in place of cholesterol, allowing them to produce compounds that inhibit cholesterol. In 1971 he found a culture broth with citrinin had potent inhibitory activity against HMG-CoA reductase and lowered serum cholesterol levels in rats, but research was suspended because of renal toxicity.

Endo studied 6,000 compounds, of which three extrolites from Penicillium citrinum mold isolated from a rice sample collected at a grain shop in Kyoto showed an effect. Findings from clinical studies were only reported in 1980.

One of them, mevastatin, was the first member of the statin class of drugs. Soon after, lovastatin, the first commercial statin, was found in the Aspergillus mold. Although mevastatin never became an approved drug, the mevastatin derivative pravastatin did.

In the late 1970s Endo moved back to Tokyo and was an associate professor and later a full professor at the Tokyo University of Agriculture and Technology between 1979 and 1997. After his official retirement he became the president of Biopharm Research Laboratories.

== Recognition ==
Endo was awarded several other prizes during his career:

- Young Investigator Award in agricultural chemistry (Japan), 1966
- Heinrich Wieland Prize for the discovery of the HMG-CoA reductase inhibitors (West Germany), 1987
- Toray Science and Technology Prize (Japan), 1988
- Warren Alpert Foundation Prize (Harvard Medical School, U.S.A), 2000
- Massry Prize from the Keck School of Medicine, University of Southern California in 2006
- Japan Prize in 2006,
- Lasker-DeBakey Clinical Medical Research Award, 2008
- Inducted into the National Inventors Hall of Fame, Alexandria, VA 2012
- Asian Scientist 100, 2016
- Gairdner Foundation International Award, 2017
- ESC Gold Medal Award, 2021

Apart from the recognition, Endo never derived financial benefit from his discovery, despite the fact that statins are amongst the most widely prescribed medications. "The millions of people whose lives will be extended through statin therapy owe it all to Akira Endo," according to Michael S. Brown and Joseph L. Goldstein, who won the 1986 Nobel Prize for related work on cholesterol.

== See also ==
- Aspergillus oryzae
- Medicinal molds
- Monascus purpureus
