= Total mycosynthesis =

Total mycosynthesis is the combination of the use of a filamentous fungal host organism with a genetic expression system that allows the assembly and controlled expression of one or more biosynthetic genes. Total mycosynthesis involves the reconstruction and/or engineering of biosynthetic pathways for the production of secondary metabolites. It is competitive with chemical total synthesis. It can be used both for the production of known natural products, and for the engineering of pathways to produce new compounds or pathway intermediates.

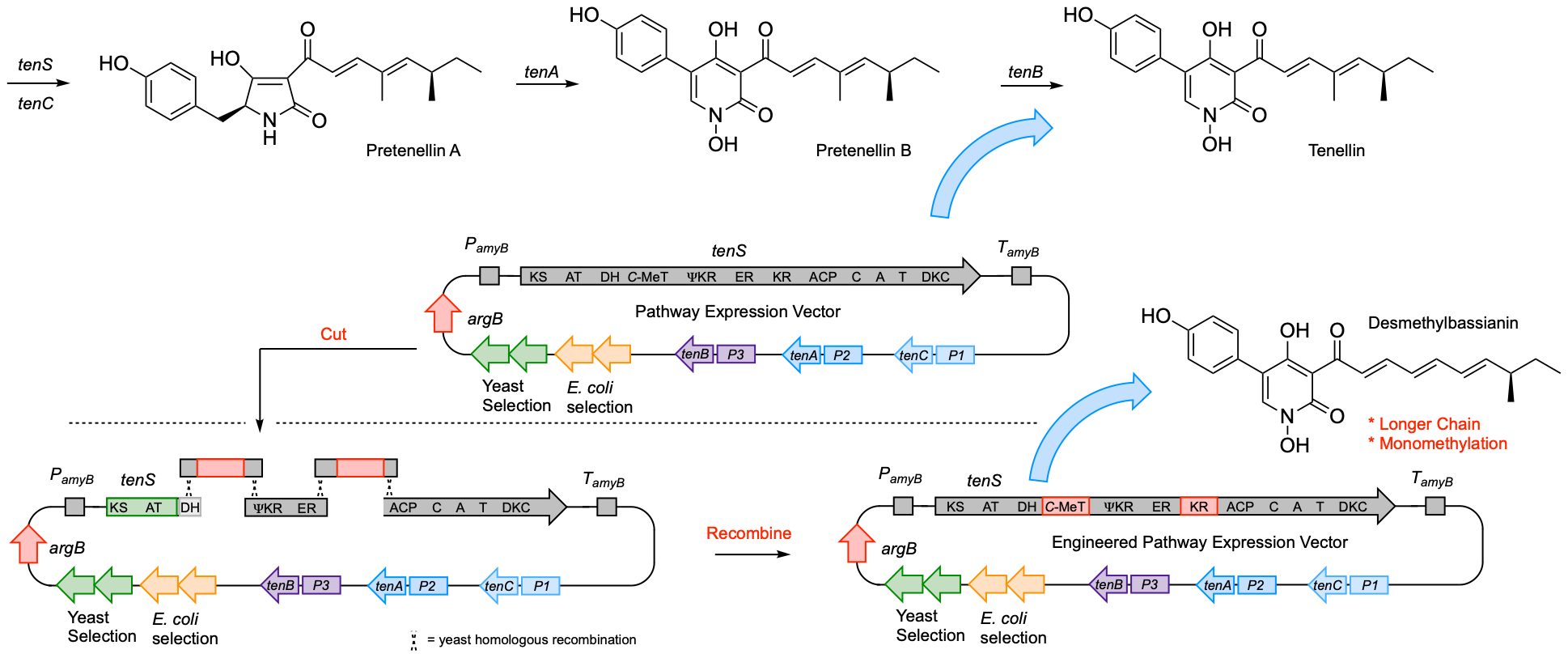
Total MycoSynthesis and Engineering of the Fungal Metabolite Tenellin

Examples include the total mycosynthesis of tenellin where the tenS, tenC, tenA and tenB genes were transferred from Beauveria bassiana to the expression host Aspergillus oryzae. The expression system allows the engineering of TenS to control chain-length and methylation pattern.

== Examples ==
Metabolite	Year	Group	Host	Step Count	Titre mg/L	Reference
Citridone B	2020	Watanabe Tang	A. nidulans	6	0.6	https://doi.org/10.1002/anie.202008321
Monacolin J	2022	Wang	A. niger	3	143	https://doi.org/10.3390/jof8040407
Tenellin	2010	Cox Lazarus	A. oryzae	3	200	https://doi.org/10.1002/cbic.201000259
Aurovertin B	2016	CCC Wang	A. nidulans	7	nd	https://doi.org/10.1021/acs.orglett.6b00299
Anditomin	2014	Abe	A. oryzae	13	5	https://doi.org/10.1021/ja508127q
Xenovulene A	2018	Cox	A. oryzae	9	0.5	https://doi.org/10.1038/s41467-018-04364-9
