= Monacolin J =

Names
- Preferred IUPAC name (4R,6R)-4-Hydroxy-6-{2-[(1S,2S,6R,8S,8aR)-8-hydroxy-2,6-dimethyl-1,2,6,7,8,8a-hexahydronaphthalen-1-yl]ethyl}oxan-2-one

Identifiers
| CAS Number | 79952-42-4 |
| 3D model (JSmol) | Interactive image |
| ChEBI | CHEBI:79034 |
| ChemSpider | 117609 |
| ECHA InfoCard | 100.110.662 |
| EC Number | 616-759-1 |
| PubChem CID | 9905162 |
| UNII | P5IQ0SI56N |
| CompTox Dashboard (EPA) | DTXSID801031414 |
- InChI: InChI=1S/C19H28O4/c1-11-7-13-4-3-12(2)16(19(13)17(21)8-11)6-5-15-9-14(20)10-18(22)23-15/h3-4,7,11-12,14-17,19-21H,5-6,8-10H2,1-2H3/t11-,12-,14+,15+,16-,17-,19-/m0/s1 Key: ZDFOBOYQVYMVCW-IRUSZSJRSA-N
- SMILES: C[C@@H]1C[C@H](O)[C@@H]2[C@@H](CC[C@@H]3C[C@@H](O)CC(=O)O3)[C@@H](C)C=CC2=C1

Properties
| Chemical formula | C_{19}H_{28}O_{4} |
| Molar mass | 320.429 g·mol^{−1} |
- Except where otherwise noted, data are given for materials in their standard state (at 25 °C [77 °F], 100 kPa). Infobox references

Monacolin J is a statin compound produced by red yeast rice. It is a precursor to simvastatin, and has potential neuroprotective activities.

Monacolin J can be produced by total mycosynthesis.
