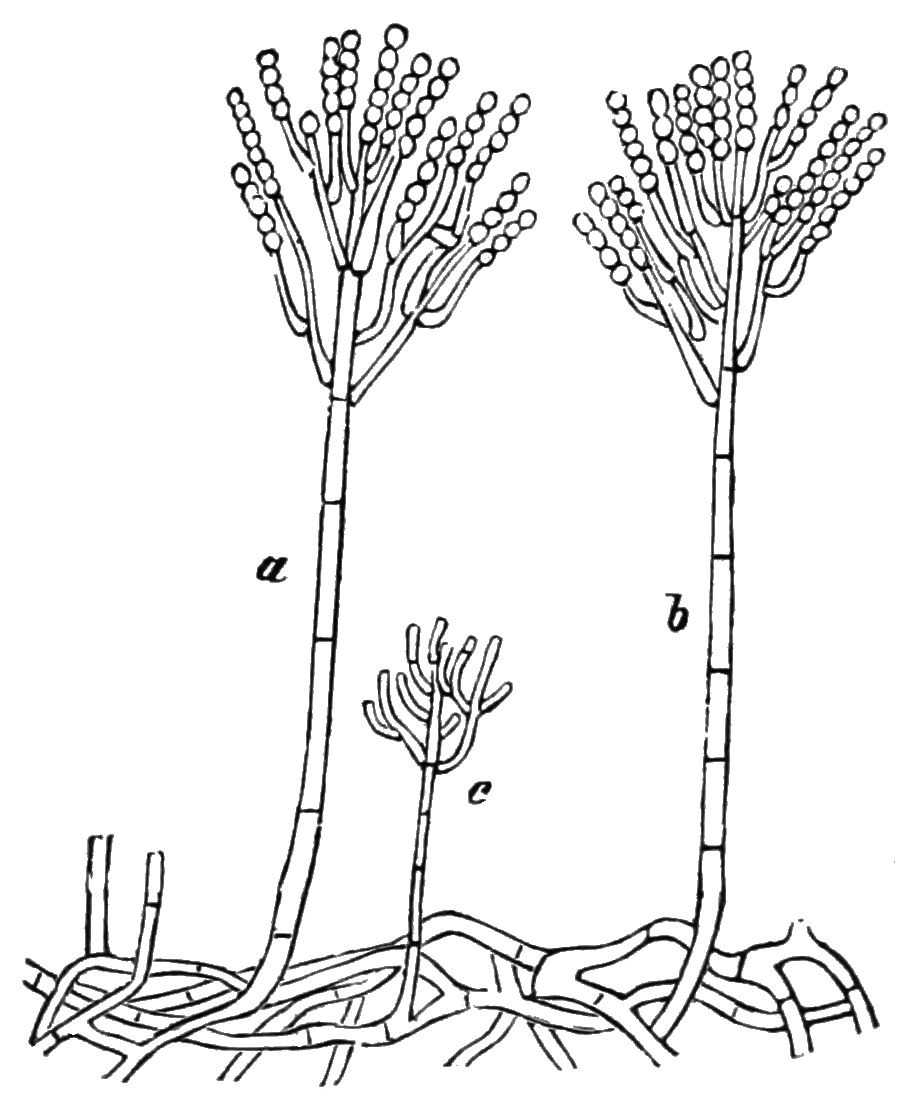
- Penicillium crustaceum

Scientific classification
- Kingdom: Fungi
- Division: Ascomycota
- Class: Eurotiomycetes
- Order: Eurotiales
- Family: Aspergillaceae
- Genus: Penicillium
- Species: P. citrinum

Binomial name
- Penicillium citrinum Thom, C. 1910

Type strain
- ATCC 1109, ATCC 36382, BCRC 32594, Biourge 53, CBS 139.45, CCRC 32594, CECT 2269, FRR 1841, IMI 091961, IMI 092196, KCTC 6549, LSHB Ad95, LSHB P25, LSHB P6, MUCL 29781, NRRL 1841, NRRL 1842, QM 6833, Thom 4733.14, Thom P25, WB 1842

Synonyms
- Penicillium citrinum var. pseudopaxilli, Citromyces subtilis, Penicillium aurifluum, Penicillium phaeojanthinellum, Penicillium sartoryi, Penicillium sartorii, Penicillium botryosum

= Penicillium citrinum =

Species of fungus

Penicillium citrinum is an anamorph, mesophilic fungus species of the genus of Penicillium which produces tanzawaic acid A-D, ACC, Mevastatin, Quinocitrinine A, Quinocitrinine B, and nephrotoxic citrinin. Penicillium citrinum is often found on moldy citrus fruits and occasionally it occurs in tropical spices and cereals. This Penicillium species also causes mortality for the mosquito Culex quinquefasciatus. Because of its mesophilic character, Penicillium citrinum occurs worldwide. The first statin (Mevastatin) was 1970 isolated from this species.

== See also ==
- List of Penicillium species
