= Fujian red wine chicken =

Chinese chicken dish

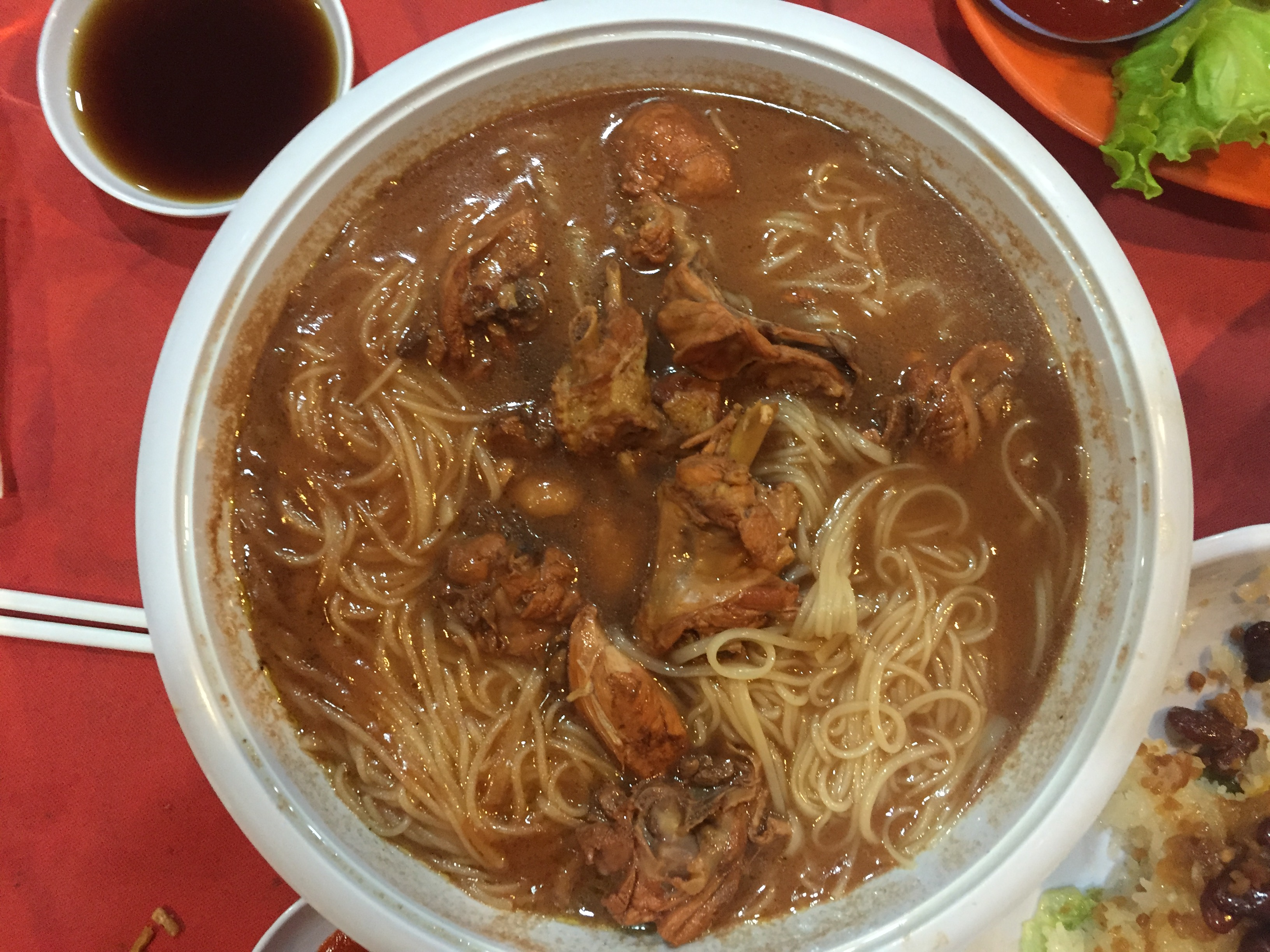
- Fujian red wine chicken
- Type: Main course
- Place of origin: Fuzhou, Fujian, China

Fujian red wine chicken (simplified Chinese: 红糟鸡; traditional Chinese: 紅糟雞; pinyin: hóngzāojī; Tâi-lô: âng-tsau-kue / âng-tsau-ke) is a traditional dish of northern Fujian cuisine which is made from braising chicken in wine lees made from red yeast rice (see lees (fermentation)). This dish is traditionally served to celebrate birthdays and served with "long life" noodle misua.

== See also ==
- List of Chinese dishes
- List of chicken dishes
