= Precursor =

Precursor or Precursors may refer to:

- Precursor (religion), a forerunner, predecessor
  - The Precursor, John the Baptist

== Science and technology ==
- Precursor (bird), hypothesized genus of fossil birds that was composed of fossilized parts of unrelated animals
- Precursor (chemistry), compound that participates in the chemical reaction that produces another compound
- Precursor (physics), phenomenon of wave patterns caused by the dispersion of an impulse's frequency components as it propagates through a medium
- Precursor in the course of a disease, the state preceding a particular stage in that course
- Precursor cell (biology), a unipotent stem cell
- Earthquake precursor, phenomenon that occurs before an earthquake and allegedly -though, so far, not demonstrably- can predict the earthquake
- Gehrlein Precursor, a glider
- LNWR Precursor Class (disambiguation), classes of passenger locomotives developed for the London and North Western Railway

== Fiction ==
- Precursor race, any hypothetical alien civilization, in science fiction, fantasy, or horror fiction, which supposedly inhabited the Earth before the earliest human civilizations
- Precursors in the Halo series, extremely advanced race that preceded and were destroyed by The Forerunners
- Precursor, novel set in C. J. Cherryh's Foreigner universe (1999)
- Precursors, fictional race (said to now be extinct) of ancient beings in the board game Cosmic Encounter
- Precursors, fictional alien race in the Star Control video game series
- Precursors, fictional race of ancient beings in the Jak and Daxter video game series
- Precursors, fictional alien race in the video game Galactic Civilizations II: Dread Lords
- Precursors, fictional alien race, said to now be almost extinct, which supposedly created humanity in the Assassin's Creed video game series
- Precursors, fictional and extremely advanced alien race in the video game Subnautica.
- Precursors, fictional, evil alien race that created the Kaiju in the movie Pacific Rim and its sequel Pacific Rim: Uprising

== Other uses ==
- Precursors of film
- The Precursors (video game), a video game from Kyiv-based developer Deep Shadows
