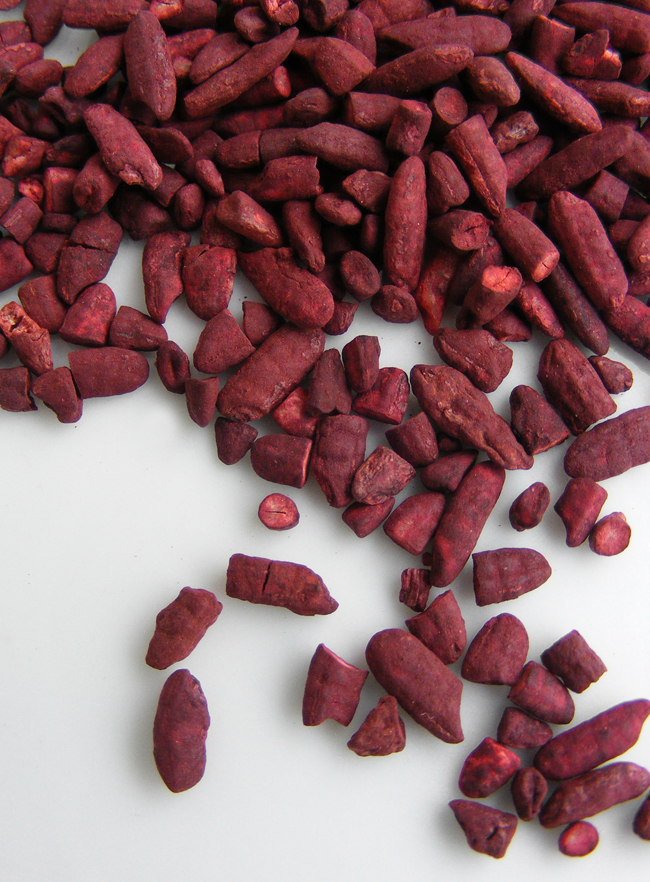
- Monascus purpureus growing on white rice (red yeast rice)

Scientific classification
- Kingdom: Fungi
- Division: Ascomycota
- Class: Eurotiomycetes
- Order: Eurotiales
- Family: Aspergillaceae
- Genus: Monascus
- Species: M. purpureus

Binomial name
- Monascus purpureus (Went, 1895)

= Monascus purpureus =

Species of fungus

Monascus purpureus (syn. M. albidus, M. anka, M. araneosus, M. major, M. rubiginosus, and M. vini; simplified Chinese: 红曲霉; traditional Chinese: 紅麴黴; pinyin: hóng qū méi, lit. "red yeast") is a species of mold that is purplish-red in color. It is also known by the names ang-khak rice mold, corn silage mold, maize silage mold, and rice kernel discoloration.

== Taxonomy and morphology ==
The sexual state of M. purpureus is a cleistothecium with a two-layered wall, enclosing round, evanescent eight-spored asci, lifted above the substrate on a multi-hyphal stalk. Ascospores can be heat-resistant. The asexual state forms chains of hyaline, or brownish, chlamydospore-like cells.

== Physiology and metabolites ==
During growth, Monascus spp. breaks down starch substrate into several metabolites, including pigments produced as secondary metabolites. The structure of pigments depends on the type of substrate and other specific factors during culture, such as acidity or basicity (pH), temperature, and moisture content.

However, discoveries of a number of cholesterol-lowering statins produced by the mold has prompted research into its possible medical uses. The naturally occurring lovastatins and analogs are called monacolins K, L, J, and also occur in their hydroxyl acid forms, along with dehydroxymonacolin and compactin (mevastatin). The prescription drug Lovastatin, identical to monacolin K, is the principal statin produced by M. purpureus. Only the open-ring (hydroxy acid) form is pharmacologically active, but it is not produced on a commercial scale.

The mycotoxin citrinin is carefully monitored when Monascus is used in fermented foods. Industrial use of soluble red pigments, as food dye, was discontinued in the United States of America (USA) and Europe because of associated risks.

== Importance ==
M. purpureus has been used for over a thousand years in oriental fermented foods, including red kōji-kin, red yeast rice, or ank-kak, rice wine, kaoliang brandy, and as the coloring agent for Peking duck.

== Commercial species ==
The related fungi M. ruber and M. pilosus are also used in industrial applications. M. ruber is also a common food spoilage organism; most strains produce a brown pigment.

== See also ==
- Aspergillus oryzae (koji)
- Fungal isolates
- List of microorganisms used in food and beverage preparation
- Medicinal molds
- Medicinal mushrooms
- Rhizopus oryzae
- Saccharomyces boulardii
- Saccharomyces cerevisiae
