= Monacolin =

Monacolins are a group of compounds produced by yeast species:

- Monacolin J
- Monacolin K or lovastatin
- Monacolin M
