= Quinocitrinine =

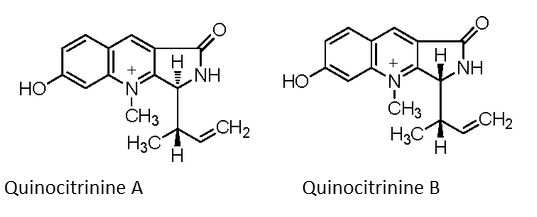

Identifiers
3D model (JSmol)	A: Interactive image; B: Interactive image
ChEBI	B: CHEBI:207099
ChemSpider	B: 9922383
PubChem CID	B: 11747679
- InChI: A: InChI=1S/C16H18N2O2/c1-4-9(2)14-15-12(16(20)17-14)7-10-5-6-11(19)8-13(10)18(15)3/h5-9,14H,4H2,1-3H3,(H,17,20)/p+1/t9-,14-/m0/s1 Key: GTNBOKIWQUJZFH-XPTSAGLGSA-O; B: InChI=1S/C16H18N2O2/c1-4-9(2)14-15-12(16(20)17-14)7-10-5-6-11(19)8-13(10)18(15)3/h5-9,14H,4H2,1-3H3,(H,17,20)/p+1/t9-,14+/m0/s1 Key: GTNBOKIWQUJZFH-LKFCYVNXSA-O
- SMILES: A: CC[C@H](C)[C@H]1C2=C(C=C3C=CC(=CC3=[N+]2C)O)C(=O)N1; B: CC[C@H](C)[C@@H]1C2=C(C=C3C=CC(=CC3=[N+]2C)O)C(=O)N1

Properties
Chemical formula	C_{16}H_{19}N_{2}O_{2}^{+}
Molar mass	271.339 g·mol^{−1}
- Except where otherwise noted, data are given for materials in their standard state (at 25 °C [77 °F], 100 kPa). Infobox references

Quinocitrinines are quinoline alkaloids isolated from a permafrost Penicillium.
