= Mevastatin =

Chemical compound

Clinical data
- Other names: Compactin; ML-236B; ML236B
- ATC code: None

Identifiers
- IUPAC name: (1S,7S,8S,8aR)-8-{2-[(2R,4R)-4-Hydroxy-6-oxotetrahydro-2H-pyran-2-yl]ethyl}-7-methyl-1,2,3,7,8,8a-hexahydronaphthalen-1-yl (2S)-2-methylbutanoate
- CAS Number: 73573-88-3
- PubChem CID: 64715
- IUPHAR/BPS: 3031
- DrugBank: DB06693
- ChemSpider: 58262
- UNII: 1UQM1K0W9X
- KEGG: C13963
- ChEBI: CHEBI:34848
- ChEMBL: ChEMBL54440
- CompTox Dashboard (EPA): DTXSID4040684
- ECHA InfoCard: 100.131.541

Chemical and physical data
- Formula: C_{23}H_{34}O_{5}
- Molar mass: 390.520 g·mol^{−1}
- 3D model (JSmol): Interactive image
- SMILES: O=C(O[C@@H]1[C@H]3C(=C/CC1)\C=C/[C@@H]([C@@H]3CC[C@H]2OC(=O)C[C@H](O)C2)C)[C@@H](C)CC
- InChI: InChI=1S/C23H34O5/c1-4-14(2)23(26)28-20-7-5-6-16-9-8-15(3)19(22(16)20)11-10-18-12-17(24)13-21(25)27-18/h6,8-9,14-15,17-20,22,24H,4-5,7,10-13H2,1-3H3/t14-,15-,17+,18+,19-,20-,22-/m0/s1; Key:AJLFOPYRIVGYMJ-INTXDZFKSA-N

Mevastatin (compactin, ML-236B) is a hypolipidemic agent that belongs to the statins class.

It was isolated from the mold Penicillium citrinum by Akira Endo in the 1970s, and he identified it as a HMG-CoA reductase inhibitor, i.e., a statin. Mevastatin might be considered the first statin drug; clinical trials on mevastatin were performed in the late 1970s in Japan, but it was never marketed. The first statin drug available to the general public was lovastatin.

Mevastatin has since been derivatized to the compound pravastatin, which is a pharmaceutical used in the lowering of cholesterol and preventing cardiovascular disease.

In vitro, it has antiproliferative properties.

A British group isolated the same compound from Penicillium brevicompactum, named it compactin, and published their results in 1976. The British group mentions antifungal properties with no mention of HMG-CoA reductase inhibition.

High doses inhibit growth and proliferation of melanoma cells.

== Biosynthesis ==
Biosynthetic pathway

Biosynthesis of mevastatin is primarily accomplished via a type 1 PKS pathway it proceeds in the PKS pathway as seen in figure 1 until it reaches a hexaketide state where it undergoes a Diels-Alder cyclization. After cyclization it continues via the PKS pathway to a nonaketide after which it is released and undergoes oxidation and dehydration. It is presumed that the oxidations are preformed by a polypeptide that is similar to cytochrome p450 monooxygenase, which is encoded by mlcC within the mevastatin gene. Lastly the biosynthesis is completed by the PKS facilitating the addition of a diketide sidechain and a methylation by SAM. Figure 1 shows mevastatin in its acid form but it can also be in the more commonly seen lactone form. This pathway was first observed in Penicillium cilrinum and was later discovered that another type of fungus, Penicillium brevicompaetum also produced mevastatin via a PKS pathway.

Lactone and acid form of mevastatin

== Pharmacology ==
Sustained elevations of cholesterol in the blood increase the risk of cardiovascular disease. Mevastatin acts to lowers hepatic production of cholesterol by competitively inhibiting HMG-CoA reductase, the enzyme that catalyzes the rate-limiting step in the cholesterol biosynthesis pathway via the mevalonic acid pathway. When hepatic cholesterol levels are decreased it causes an increased uptake of low density lipoprotein (LDL) cholesterol and reduces cholesterol levels in the circulation. It has also been shown that mevastatin upregulates endothelial nitric oxide synthase (eNOS) in mice, which is essential for maintaining a healthy cardiovascular system.

== See also ==
- Medicinal molds
