= Red yeast rice =

Type of bright reddish purple fermented rice

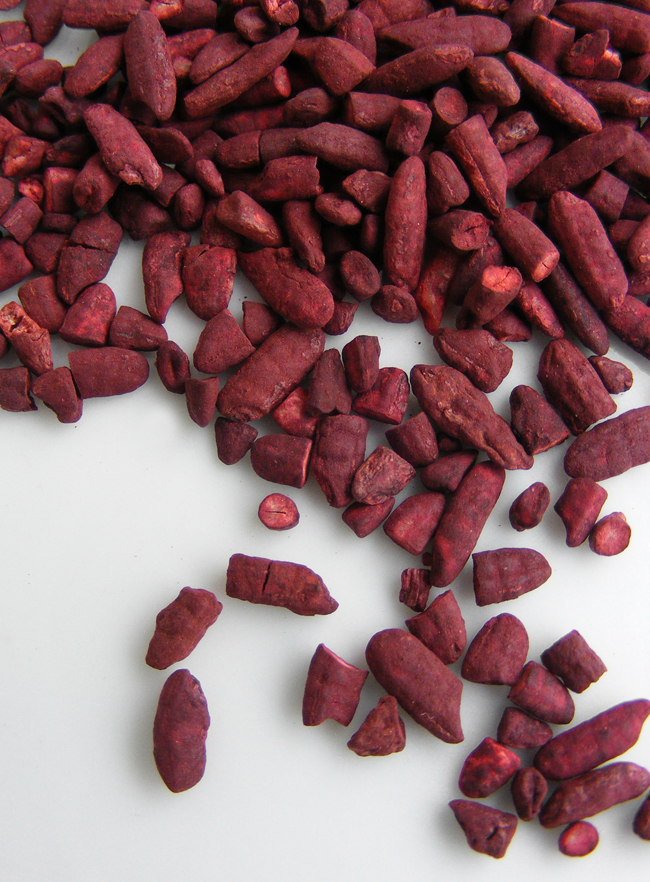
- Wet rice cultivated with the mold species Monascus purpureus turns red; the rice when dried is called red yeast rice.

Chinese name
- Traditional Chinese: 紅麴米
- Simplified Chinese: 红曲米
- Literal meaning: red yeast rice
Transcriptions
Standard Mandarin
- Hanyu Pinyin: hóng qū mǐ
Yue: Cantonese
- Jyutping: hung4 kuk1 mai5
Southern Min
- Hokkien POJ: âng-khak-bí

Japanese name
- Hiragana: べにこうじ
Transcriptions
- Romanization: benikōji

Red yeast rice or red rice koji is a bright reddish purple fermented rice, which acquires its color from being cultivated with the mold Monascus purpureus. Red yeast rice is what is referred to as a kōji in Japanese, meaning "grain or bean overgrown with a mold culture", a food preparation tradition going back to ca. 300 BCE.

In addition to its culinary use, red yeast rice is also used in Chinese herbology and Traditional Chinese medicine, possibly during the Tang dynasty around 800 CE. Red yeast rice is described in the Chinese pharmacopoeia Ben Cao Gang Mu by Li Shizhen.

Use as a dietary supplement in the modern era developed in the late 1970s, after separate researchers were isolating lovastatin from Aspergillus and monacolins from Monascus, the latter being the type of fungus used to make red yeast rice. Chemical analysis soon showed that lovastatin and monacolin K were identical. Lovastatin became the patented prescription drug Mevacor, and red yeast rice went on to become a non-prescription dietary supplement in the United States and other countries. In 1998, the U.S. Food and Drug Administration (FDA) initiated action to ban dietary supplements containing red yeast rice extract, arguing that red yeast rice products containing monacolin K are identical to a prescription drug, and are thus subject to regulation as a drug.

== Terminology ==
Red yeast rice is also known as red fermented rice, red kojic rice or red koji rice from its Japanese name, and anka or angkak from Southern Min pronunciations of its Chinese name. In both the scientific and popular literature in English that draws principally on Japanese traditional use, red yeast rice is most often referred to as "red rice koji". English language articles favoring Chinese literature sources prefer the translation "red yeast rice".

== Production ==
Red yeast rice is produced by cultivating the mold species Monascus purpureus on rice for 3–6 days at room temperature. The rice grains turn bright red at the core and reddish purple on the outside. The fully cultured rice is then either sold as the dried grain, or cooked and pasteurized to be sold as a wet paste, or dried and pulverized to be sold as a fine powder. China is the world's largest producer of red yeast rice, but European companies have entered the market.

== Uses ==
=== Culinary ===
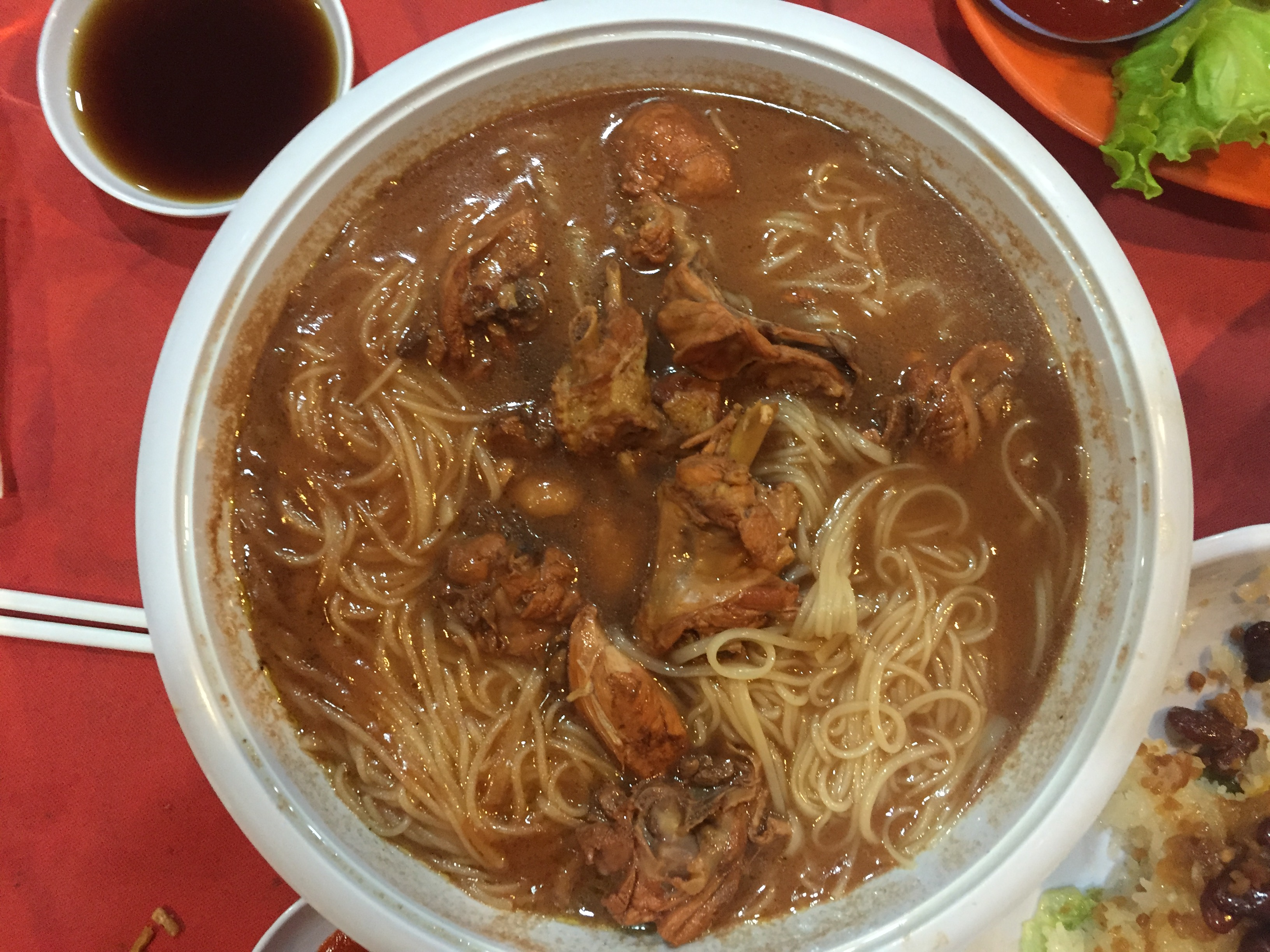
Fujian red wine chicken with misua noodles

Red yeast rice is used to color a wide variety of food products, including fermented tofu, red rice vinegar, char siu, Peking duck, and Chinese pastries that require red food coloring.

In China, documentation dates back to at least the first century CE. It is also traditionally used in the production of several types of Chinese huangjiu (Shaoxing jiu), and Japanese sake (akaisake), imparting a reddish color to these wines. It was called a "koji" in Japanese, meaning "grain or bean overgrown with a mold culture".

The lees left over from wine production, known as hóngzāo (红糟), can be used as flavoring, imparting a subtle but pleasant taste to food. The lees are particularly commonly used in Fujian cuisine, where they are used for dishes like Fujian red wine chicken, a celebratory dish associated with birthdays and Chinese New Year.

Red yeast rice (angkák in Filipino) is also used widely in the Philippines to traditionally color and preserve certain dishes like fermented shrimp (bagoóng alamáng), burong isdâ (fermented rice and fish), and balao-balao (fermented rice and shrimp).

=== Traditional Chinese medicine ===
In addition to its culinary use, red yeast rice is also used in Chinese herbology and traditional Chinese medicine. Medicinal use of red yeast rice is described in the Chinese pharmacopoeia Ben Cao Gang Mu compiled by Li Shizhen ca. 1590. Recommendations were to take it internally to invigorate the body, aid in digestion, and revitalize the blood. One reference provided the Li Shizhen health claims as a quotation "...the effect of promoting the circulation of blood and releasing stasis, invigorating the spleen, and eliminating [in]digestion."

=== Red yeast rice and statin drugs ===
In the late 1970s, researchers in the United States and Japan were isolating lovastatin from Aspergillus and monacolins from Monascus, the latter being the same fungus used to make red yeast rice (RYR) when cultured under carefully controlled conditions. Chemical analysis soon showed that lovastatin and monacolin K are identical chemical compounds. The two isolations, documentations, and patent applications occurred months apart. Lovastatin became the patented, prescription drug Mevacor. Red yeast rice went on to become a non-prescription dietary supplement in the United States and other countries.

Lovastatin and other prescription statin drugs inhibit cholesterol synthesis by blocking action of the enzyme HMG-CoA reductase. As a consequence, circulating total cholesterol and LDL-cholesterol are lowered by 24–49% depending on the statin and dose. Different strains of Monascus fungus will produce different amounts of monacolins. The 'Went' strain of Monascus purpureus (purpureus=dark red in Latin), when properly fermented and processed, will yield a dried red yeast rice powder that is approximately 0.4% monacolins, of which roughly half will be monacolin K (chemically identical to lovastatin).

==== U.S. regulatory restrictions ====
The US Food and Drug Administration (FDA) position is that red yeast rice products that contain monacolin K are identical to a prescription drug and, thus, subject to regulation as a drug. In 1998, the FDA initiated action to ban a product (Cholestin) containing red yeast rice extract. The U.S. District Court in Utah ruled in favor of allowing the product to be sold without restriction. This decision was reversed on appeal to the U.S. Court of Appeals in 2001. In 2007, the FDA sent warning letters to two dietary supplement companies. One was making a monacolin content claim about its RYR product and the other was not, but the FDA noted that both products contained monacolins. Both products were withdrawn. In a press release the FDA "...is warning consumers to not buy or eat red yeast rice products... may contain an unauthorized drug that could be harmful to health." The rationale for "harmful to health" was that consumers might not understand that the dangers of monacolin-containing red yeast rice are the same as those of prescription statin drugs.

A products analysis report from 2010 tested 12 products commercially available in the U.S. and reported that per 600 mg capsule, total monacolins content ranged from 0.31 to 11.15 mg. A 2017 study tested 28 brands of red yeast rice supplements purchased from U.S. retailers, stating "the quantity of monacolin K varied from none to prescription strength". Many of these avoid FDA regulation by not having any appreciable monacolin content. Their labels and websites say no more than "fermented according to traditional Asian methods" or "similar to that used in culinary applications". The labeling on these products often says nothing about cholesterol lowering. If products do not contain lovastatin, do not claim to contain lovastatin, and do not make a claim to lower cholesterol, they are not subject to FDA action. Two reviews confirm that the monacolin content of red yeast rice dietary supplements can vary over a wide range, with some containing negligible monacolins.

==== Clinical evidence ====
The amount typically used in clinical trials is 1200–2400 mg/day of red yeast rice containing approximately 10 mg total monacolins, of which half are monacolin K. A meta-analysis reported LDL-cholesterol lowered by 1.02 mmol/L (39.4 mg/dL) compared to placebo. The incidence of reported adverse effects ranged from 0% to 5% and was not different from controls. A second meta-analysis incorporating more recent clinical trials also reported significant lowering of total cholesterol and LDL-cholesterol.

Within the first review, the largest and longest duration trial was conducted in China. Close to 5,000 post-heart attack patients were enrolled for an average of 4.5 years to receive either a placebo or a RYR product named xuezhikang (Chinese: 血脂康; pinyin: xuè zhī kāng). The test product was an ethanol extract of red yeast rice, with a monacolin K content of 11.6 mg/day. Key results: in the treated group, risk of subsequent heart attacks was reduced by 45%, cardio deaths by 31%, and all-cause deaths by 33%. These heart attack and cardiovascular death outcomes appear to be better than what has been reported for prescription statin drugs. A 2008 review pointed out that the cardioprotective effects of statins in Japanese populations occur at lower doses than are needed in Western populations, and theorized that the low amount of monacolins found in the xuezhikang product might have been more effectively athero-protective than expected in the Chinese population for the same reason.

==== Safety ====
The safety of red yeast rice (RYR) products has not been established. Some supplements have been found to contain high levels of citrinin, which can be toxic to the liver, kidneys, and cellular DNA. Commercial products also have highly variable amounts of monacolins and rarely declare this content on the label, making risk assessment difficult. Ingredient suppliers have been suspected of "spiking" red yeast rice preparations with purified lovastatin. One published analysis reported several commercial products as being almost entirely monacolin K—which would occur if the drug lovastatin was illegally added—rather than the expected composition of many monacolin compounds.

There are reports in the literature of muscle myopathy and liver damage resulting from red yeast rice usage. From a review: "The potential safety signals of myopathies and liver injury raise the hypothesis that the safety profile of RYR is similar to that of statins. Continuous monitoring of dietary supplements should be promoted to finally characterize their risk profile, thus supporting regulatory bodies for appropriate actions." The European Food Safety Authority (EFSA) Panel on Food Additives and Nutrient Sources added to Food concluded that when red yeast rice preparations contained monacolins, the Panel was unable to identify an intake that it could consider as safe. The reason given was case study reports of severe adverse reactions to products containing monacolins at amounts as low as 3 mg/day. Red yeast rice is not recommended during pregnancy or breast-feeding.

In March 2024, the Japanese Ministry of Health ordered stores to remove three RYR dietary supplements (Benikoji ColesteHelp, NaishiHelp Plus Cholesterol and Natto-kinase Sarasara Tsubu) produced by Kobayashi Pharmaceutical after reports of thousands made ill. Over a hundred people between the ages of 40 and 80 were hospitalized, and five had died as of 29 March, with four of them from kidney problems. There have been more than twelve thousand cases of health problems reported by users. The company said it uses a strain that does not produce citrinin. It has found puberulic acid in the recalled products and is looking into whether the substance might be linked to the fatalities. The suspect batch was manufactured in 2023. Some analysts have placed the blame on industry deregulation, intended to boost economic growth by facilitating the approval of health products. Benikoji products such as miso paste, crackers, food coloring, and a vinegar dressing made by other companies were also recalled. Kobayashi Pharmaceutical officially discontinued production of beni koji products on 8 August 2024.

== See also ==
- List of microorganisms used in food and beverage preparation
- Medicinal fungi
