= LNWR Precursor Class =

The London and North Western Railway (LNWR) had three classes of steam locomotive identified as Precursor Class:

- LNWR Webb Precursor Class of 1874–1879 by Francis Webb, a 2-4-0
- LNWR Whale Precursor Class of 1904–1907 by George Whale, a 4-4-0
- LNWR Precursor Tank Class, 4-4-2 tank engines based on the Whale precursors
