= Lovastatin =

Chemical compound

Clinical data
- Trade names: Mevacor, Altocor, others
- Other names: Monacolin K, Mevinolin
- AHFS/Drugs.com: Monograph
- MedlinePlus: a688006
- License data: US DailyMed: Lovastatin
- Routes of administration: By mouth
- ATC code: C10AA02 (WHO)

Legal status
- Legal status: US: ℞-only

Pharmacokinetic data
- Bioavailability: <5%
- Protein binding: >98%
- Metabolism: Liver (CYP3A and CYP2C8 substrate)
- Elimination half-life: 2–5 hours
- Excretion: Feces (83%), urine (10%)

Identifiers
- IUPAC name: (1S,3R,7S,8S,8aR)-8-{2-[(2R,4R)-4-Hydroxy-6-oxooxan-2-yl]ethyl}-3,7-dimethyl-1,2,3,7,8,8a-hexahydronaphthalen-1-yl (2S)-2-methylbutanoate
- CAS Number: 75330-75-5
- PubChem CID: 53232
- IUPHAR/BPS: 2739
- DrugBank: DB00227
- ChemSpider: 48085
- UNII: 9LHU78OQFD
- KEGG: D00359
- ChEBI: CHEBI:40303
- ChEMBL: ChEMBL503
- CompTox Dashboard (EPA): DTXSID5020784
- ECHA InfoCard: 100.115.931

Chemical and physical data
- Formula: C_{24}H_{36}O_{5}
- Molar mass: 404.547 g·mol^{−1}
- 3D model (JSmol): Interactive image
- SMILES: O=C(O[C@@H]1[C@H]3C(=C/[C@H](C)C1)\C=C/[C@@H]([C@@H]3CC[C@H]2OC(=O)C[C@H](O)C2)C)[C@@H](C)CC
- InChI: InChI=1S/C24H36O5/c1-5-15(3)24(27)29-21-11-14(2)10-17-7-6-16(4)20(23(17)21)9-8-19-12-18(25)13-22(26)28-19/h6-7,10,14-16,18-21,23,25H,5,8-9,11-13H2,1-4H3/t14-,15-,16-,18+,19+,20-,21-,23-/m0/s1; Key:PCZOHLXUXFIOCF-BXMDZJJMSA-N

Lovastatin (also known as Monacolin K) is a statin medication which is used to treat high blood cholesterol and reduce the risk of cardiovascular disease. Its use is recommended along with lifestyle changes. It is taken by mouth.

Common side effects include diarrhea, constipation, headache, muscle pains, rash, and trouble sleeping. Serious side effects may include liver problems, muscle breakdown, and kidney failure. Use during pregnancy may harm the baby and use during breastfeeding is not recommended. It works by decreasing the liver's ability to produce cholesterol by blocking the enzyme HMG-CoA reductase.

Lovastatin was patented in 1979, and approved for medical use in the United States 1987. It is sold under the brand name Mevacor among others, and is available as a generic medication. It is on the World Health Organization's List of Essential Medicines. In 2023, it was the 132nd most commonly prescribed medication in the United States, with more than 4 million prescriptions.

== Medical uses ==
The primary uses of lovastatin is for the treatment of dyslipidemia and the prevention of cardiovascular disease. It is recommended to be used only after other measures, such as diet, exercise, and weight reduction, have not improved cholesterol levels.

== Side effects ==
Lovastatin is usually well tolerated, with the most common side effects being, in approximately descending order of frequency: creatine phosphokinase elevation, flatulence, abdominal pain, constipation, diarrhoea, muscle aches or pains, nausea, indigestion, weakness, blurred vision, rash, dizziness and muscle cramps. As with all statin drugs, it can occasionally cause myopathy, hepatotoxicity (liver damage), dermatomyositis or rhabdomyolysis. This can be life-threatening if not recognised and treated in time, so any unexplained muscle pain or weakness whilst on lovastatin should be promptly mentioned to the prescribing doctor. Other uncommon side effects that should be promptly mentioned to either the prescribing doctor or an emergency medical service include:

- muscle pain, tenderness, or weakness
- lack of energy
- weakness
- fever
- dark colored urine
- jaundice: yellowing of the skin or eyes
- pain in the upper right part of the stomach
- nausea
- unusual bleeding or bruising
- loss of appetite
- flu-like symptoms
- rash
- hives
- itching
- difficulty breathing or swallowing
- swelling of the face, throat, tongue, lips, eyes, hands, feet, ankles, or lower legs
- hoarseness

These less serious side effects should still be reported if they persist or increase in severity:

- constipation
- memory loss or forgetfulness
- confusion

=== Contraindications ===
Contraindications, conditions that warrant withholding treatment with lovastatin, include pregnancy, breast feeding, and liver disease. Lovastatin is contraindicated during pregnancy (Pregnancy Category X); it may cause birth defects such as skeletal deformities or learning disabilities. Owing to its potential to disrupt infant lipid metabolism, lovastatin should not be taken while breastfeeding. Patients with liver disease should not take lovastatin.

== Interactions ==
As with atorvastatin, simvastatin, and other statin drugs metabolized via CYP3A4, drinking grapefruit juice during lovastatin therapy may increase the risk of side effects. Components of grapefruit juice, the flavonoid naringin, or the furanocoumarin bergamottin inhibit CYP3A4 in vitro, and may account for the in vivo effect of grapefruit juice concentrate decreasing the metabolic clearance of lovastatin, and increasing its plasma concentrations.

== Mechanism of action ==
Lovastatin is an inhibitor of 3-hydroxy-3-methylglutaryl-coenzyme A reductase (HMG-CoA reductase), an enzyme that catalyzes the conversion of HMG-CoA to mevalonate. Mevalonate is a required building block for cholesterol biosynthesis and lovastatin interferes with its production by acting as a reversible competitive inhibitor for HMG-CoA, which binds to the HMG-CoA reductase. Lovastatin is a prodrug, an inactive lactone in its native form, the gamma-lactone closed ring form in which it is administered, is hydrolysed in vivo to the β-hydroxy acid open ring form; which is the active form.

Lovastatin and other statins have been studied for their chemopreventive and chemotherapeutic effects. No such effects were seen in the early studies. More recent investigations revealed some chemopreventive and therapeutic effects, for certain types of cancer, especially in combination of statins with other anticancer drugs. It is likely that these effect are mediated by the properties of statins to reduce proteasome activity, leading to an accumulation of cyclin-dependent kinase inhibitors p21 and p27, and to subsequent G_{1}-phase arrest, as seen in cells of different cancer lines.

== History ==
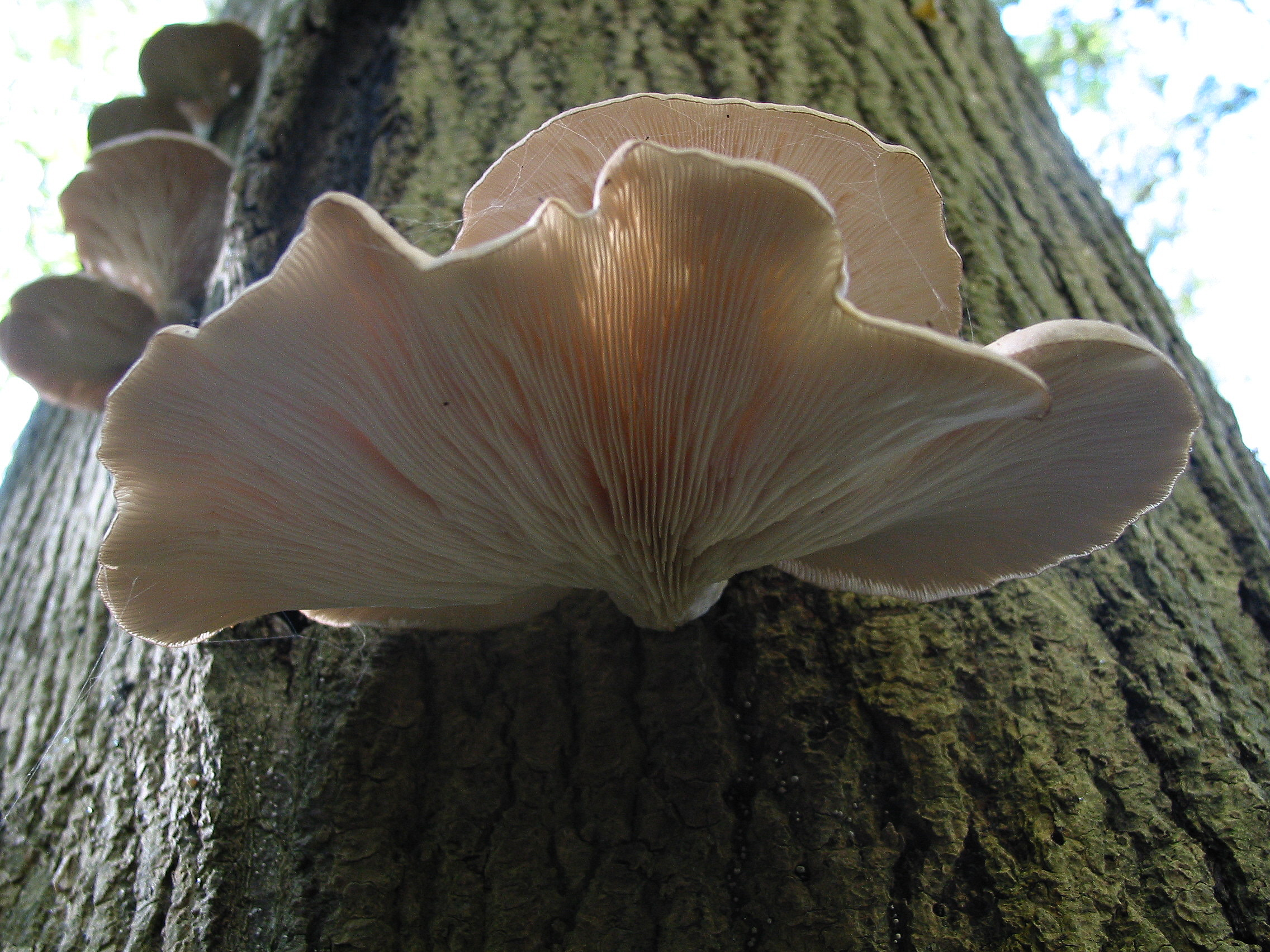
Pleurotus ostreatus, the oyster mushroom, naturally contains up to 2.8% lovastatin on a dry weight basis.

Compactin and lovastatin, natural products with a powerful inhibitory effect on HMG-CoA reductase, were discovered in the 1970s, and taken into clinical development as potential drugs for lowering LDL cholesterol.

In 1982, some small-scale clinical investigations of lovastatin, a polyketide-derived natural product isolated from Aspergillus terreus, in very high-risk patients were undertaken, in which dramatic reductions in LDL cholesterol were observed, with very few adverse effects. After the additional animal safety studies with lovastatin revealed no toxicity of the type thought to be associated with compactin, clinical studies continued.

Large-scale trials confirmed the effectiveness of lovastatin. Observed tolerability continued to be excellent, and lovastatin was approved by the US FDA in 1987. It was the first statin approved by the FDA.

Lovastatin is also naturally produced by certain higher fungi, such as Pleurotus ostreatus (oyster mushroom) and closely related Pleurotus spp. Research into the effect of oyster mushroom and its extracts on the cholesterol levels of laboratory animals has been extensive, although the effect has been demonstrated in a very limited number of human subjects.

In 1998, the FDA placed a ban on the sale of dietary supplements derived from red yeast rice, which naturally contains lovastatin, arguing that products containing prescription agents require drug approval. Judge Dale A. Kimball of the United States District Court for the District of Utah, granted a motion by Cholestin's manufacturer, Pharmanex, that the agency's ban was illegal under the 1994 Dietary Supplement Health and Education Act because the product was marketed as a dietary supplement, not a drug.

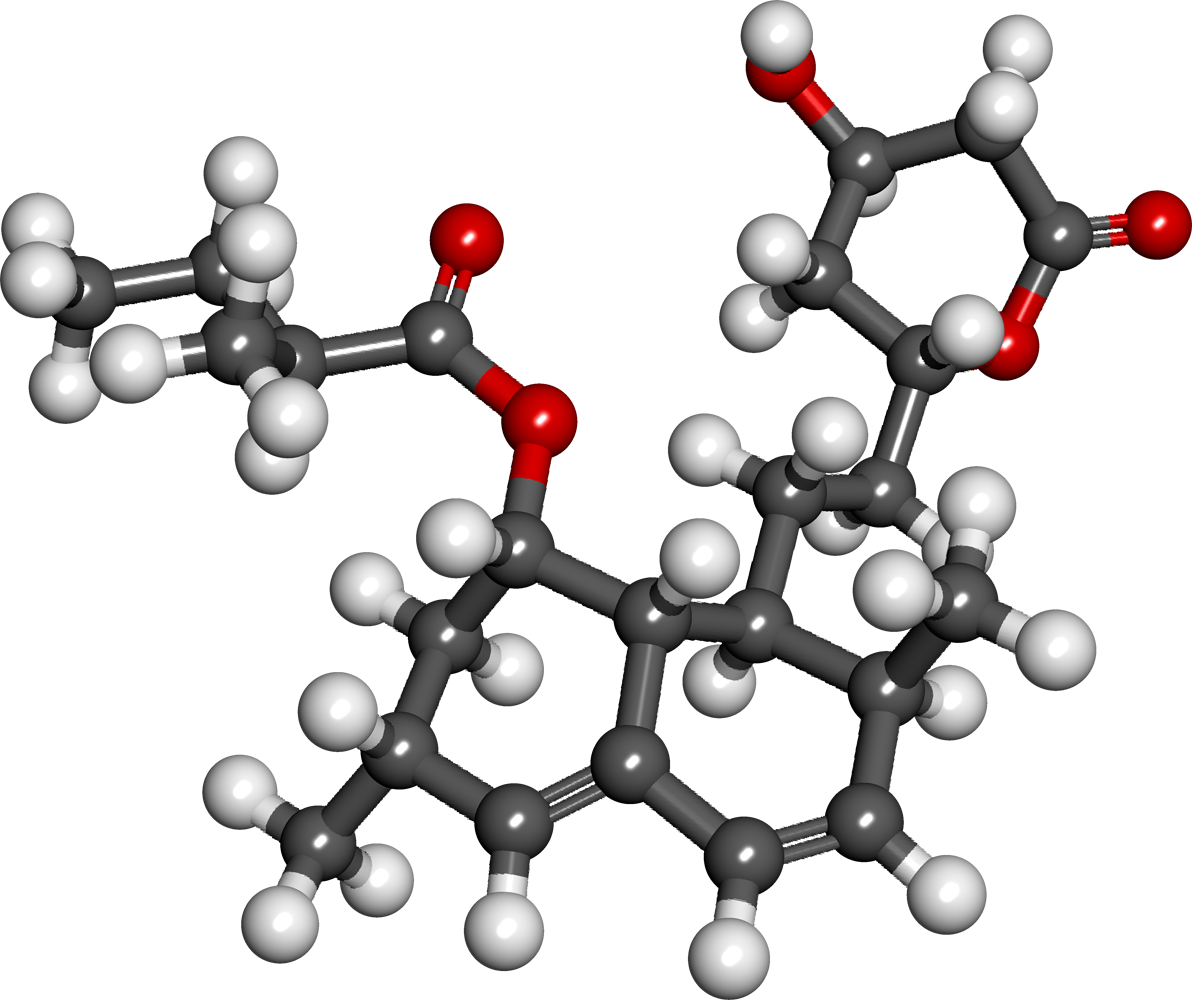
A ball-and-stick model of lovastatin

The objective is to decrease excess levels of cholesterol to an amount consistent with maintenance of normal body function. Cholesterol is biosynthesized in a series of more than 25 separate enzymatic reactions that initially involves three successive condensations of acetyl-CoA units to form the six-carbon compound 3-hydroxy-3-methylglutaryl coenzyme A (HMG CoA). This is reduced to mevalonate and then converted in a series of reactions to the isoprenes that are building-blocks of squalene, the immediate precursor to sterols, which cyclizes to lanosterol (a methylated sterol) and further metabolized to cholesterol.

A number of early attempts to block the synthesis of cholesterol resulted in agents that inhibited late in the biosynthetic pathway between lanosterol and cholesterol. A major rate-limiting step in the pathway is at the level of the microsomal enzyme that catalyzes the conversion of HMG CoA to mevalonic acid, and that has been considered to be a prime target for pharmacologic intervention for several years.

HMG CoA reductase occurs early in the biosynthetic pathway and is among the first committed steps to cholesterol formulation. Inhibition of this enzyme could lead to accumulation of HMG CoA, a water-soluble intermediate that is, then, capable of being readily metabolized to simpler molecules. This inhibition of reductase would lead to accumulation of lipophylic intermediates with a formal sterol ring.

Lovastatin was the first specific inhibitor of HMG CoA reductase to receive approval for the treatment of hypercholesterolemia. The first breakthrough in efforts to find a potent, specific, competitive inhibitor of HMG CoA reductase occurred in 1976, when Endo et al. reported the discovery of mevastatin, a highly functionalized fungal metabolite, isolated from cultures of Penicillium citrium.

=== Biosynthesis ===
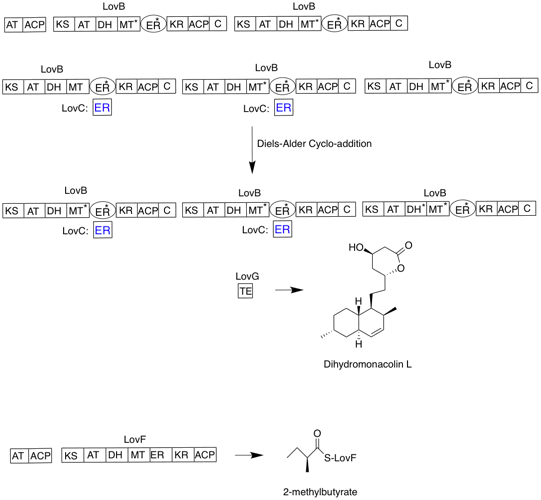
Architecture of the lovastatin type I PKS system. Outlined domains are used iteratively. ACP- acyl carrier protein, AD-alcohol dehydrogenase, AT-acyltransferase, DH-dehydratase, KS-ketoacyl synthase, KR-ketoreductase, MT-methyltransferase, ER-enoylreductase, C-condensation, TE-thioesterase. (*)-redundant domain/inactive not used in this step.

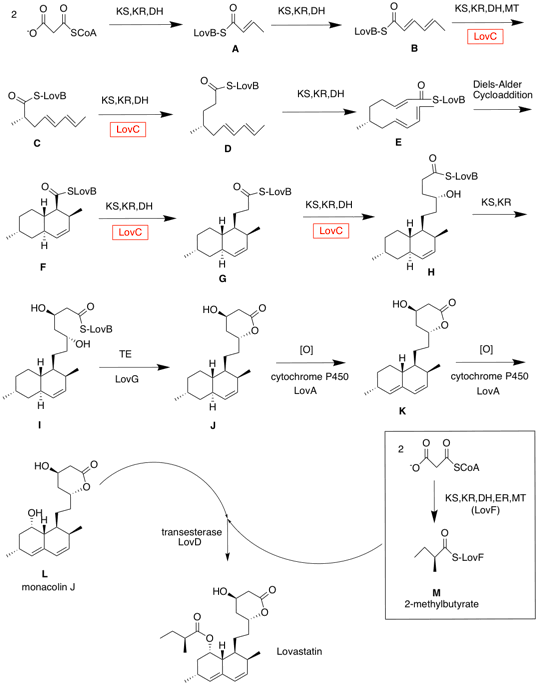
Biosynthesis of lovastatin

The biosynthesis of lovastatin occurs via an iterative type I polyketide synthase (PKS) pathway. The six genes that encode enzymes that are essential for the biosynthesis of lovastatin are lovB, lovC, lovA, lovD, lovG, and lovF . The synthesis of dihydromonacolin L requires a total of 9-malonyl Coa . It proceeds in the PKS pathway until it reaches (E) a hexaketide, where it undergoes a Diels-Alder cycloaddition to form the fused rings. After cyclization it continues through the PKS pathway until it reaches (I) a nonaketide, which then undergoes release from LovB through the thioesterase encoded by LovG. Dihydromonacolin L, (J), then undergoes oxidation and dehydration via a cytochrome P450 oxygenase encoded by LovA to obtain monacolin J, (L).

The MT domain from lovB is active in the conversion of (B) to (C) when it transfers a methyl group from S-adenosyl-L-methionine (SAM) to the tetraketide (C) . Because LovB contains an inactive ER domain, LovC is required at specific steps to obtain fully reduced products. The domain organization of LovB, LovC, LovG and LovF is shown in Figure 2. The inactive ER domain of lovB is shown with an oval and where LovC acts in trans to LovB is shown with a red box.

In a parallel pathway, the diketide side chain of lovastatin is synthesized by another highly reducing type I polyketide synthase enzyme encoded by LovF . Lastly, the side chain, 2-methylbutyrate (M) is covalently attached to C-8 hydroxy group of monacolin J (L) by a transesterase encoded by LovD to form lovastatin.

=== Total synthesis ===
A major bulk of work in the synthesis of lovastatin was done by M. Hirama in the 1980s. Hirama synthesized compactin and used one of the intermediates to follow a different path to get to lovastatin. The synthetic sequence is shown in the schemes below. The γ-lactone was synthesized using Yamada methodology starting with glutamic acid. Lactone opening was done using lithium methoxide in methanol and then silylation to give a separable mixture of the starting lactone and the silyl ether. The silyl ether on hydrogenolysis followed by Collins oxidation gave the aldehyde. Stereoselective preparation of (E,E)-diene was accomplished by addition of trans-crotyl phenyl sulfone anion, followed by quenching with Ac_{2}O and subsequent reductive elimination of sulfone acetate. Condensation of this with lithium anion of dimethyl methylphosphonate gave compound 1. Compound 2 was synthesized as shown in the scheme in the synthetic procedure. Compounds 1 and 2 were then combined using 1.3 eq sodium hydride in THF followed by reflux in chlorobenzene for 82 hr under nitrogen to get the enone 3.

Simple organic reactions were used to get to lovastatin as shown in the scheme.

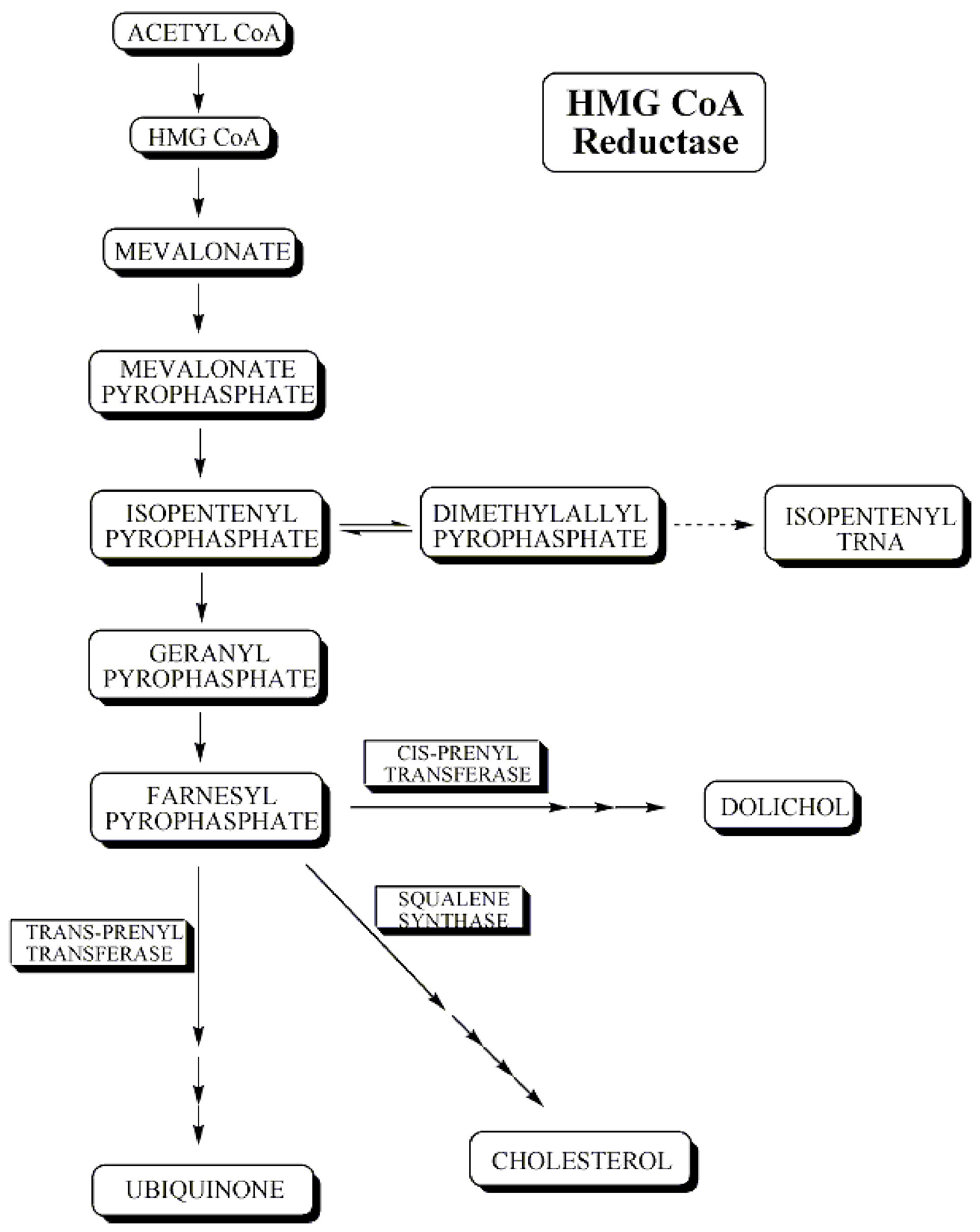
Cholesterol biosynthetic pathway

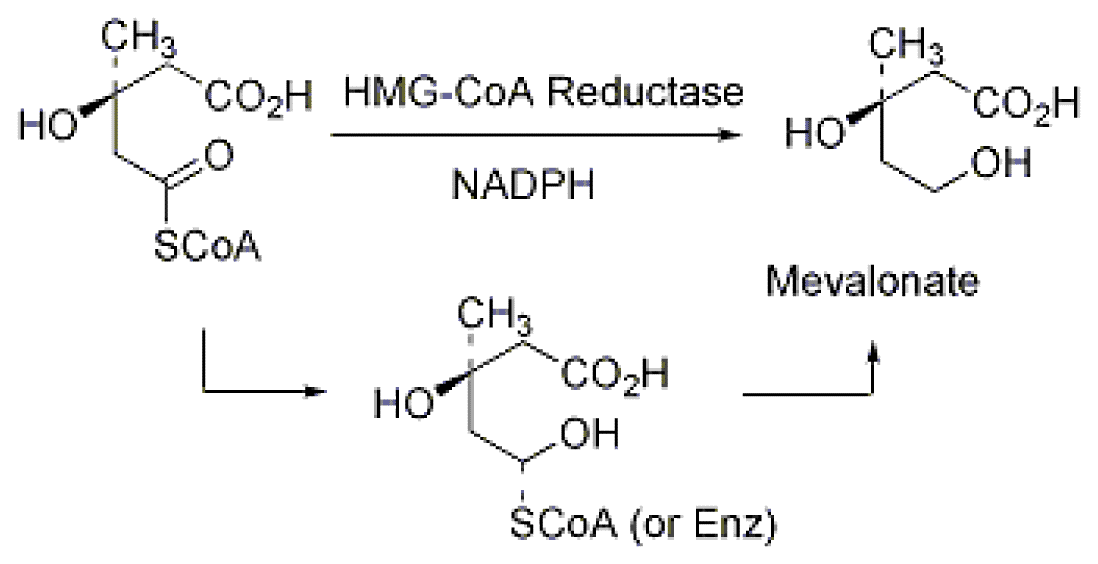
HMG CoA reductase reaction

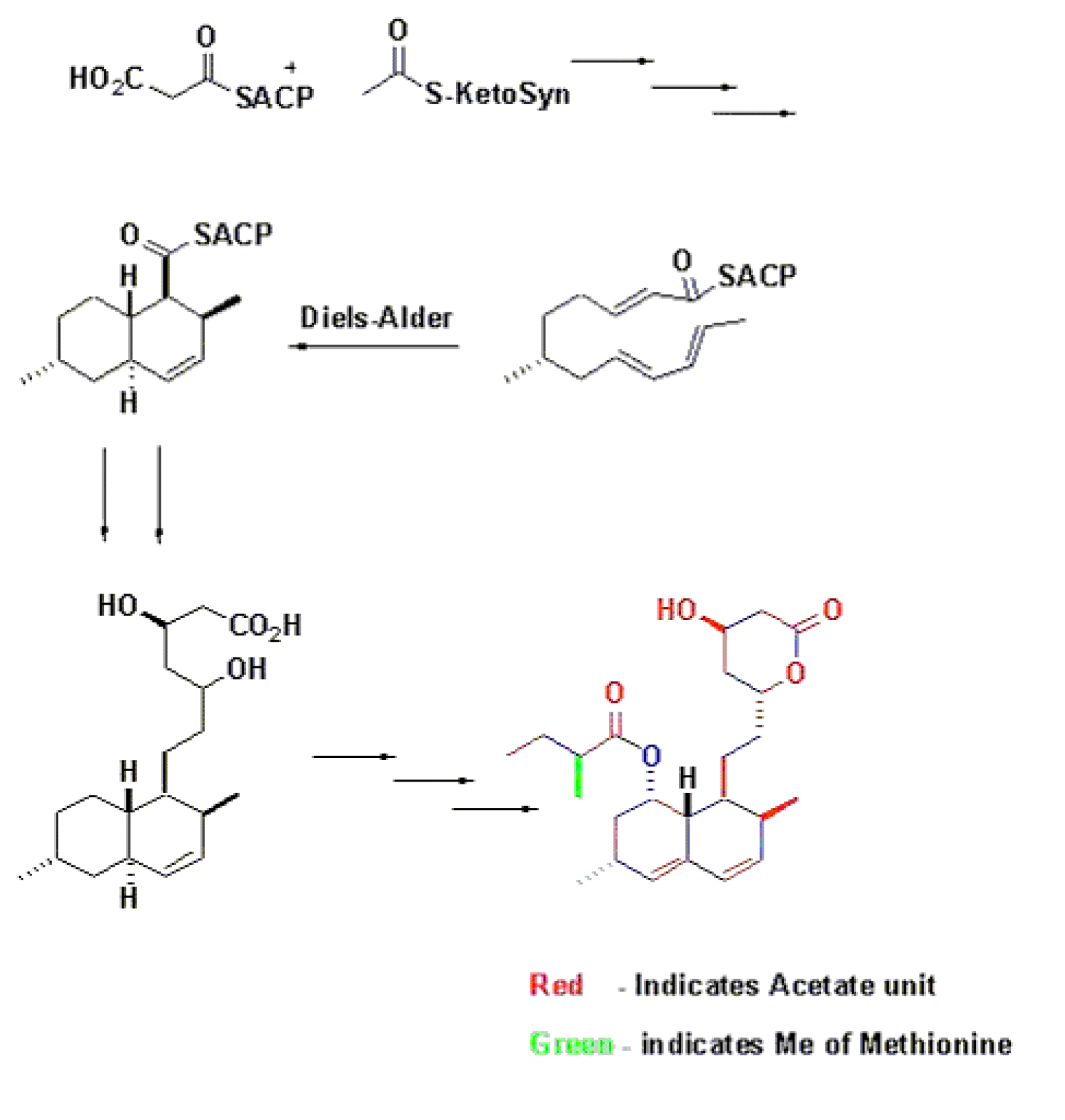
Biosynthesis using Diels-Alder catalyzed cyclization

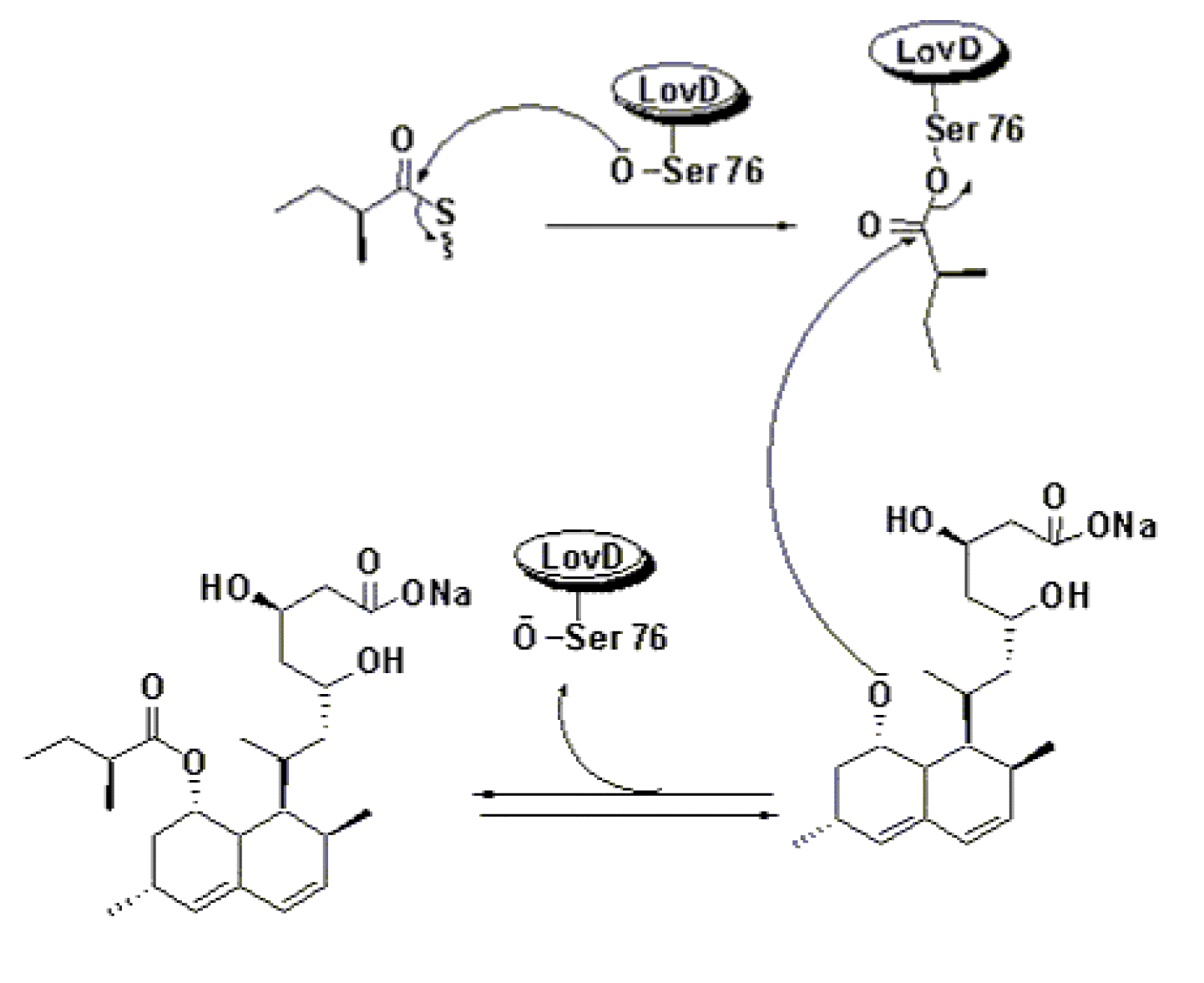
Biosynthesis using broadly specific acyltransferase

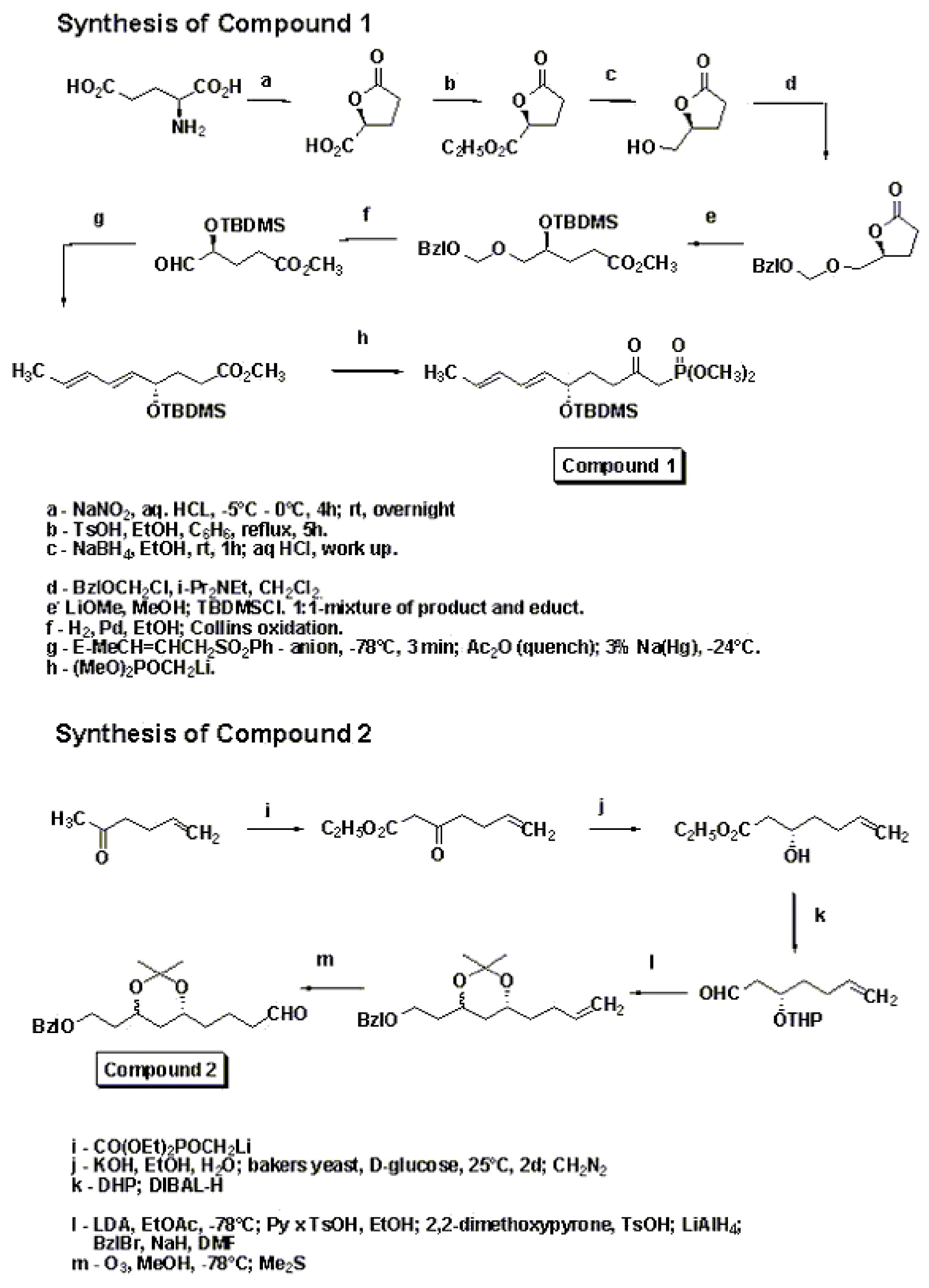
Synthesis of compounds 1 and 2

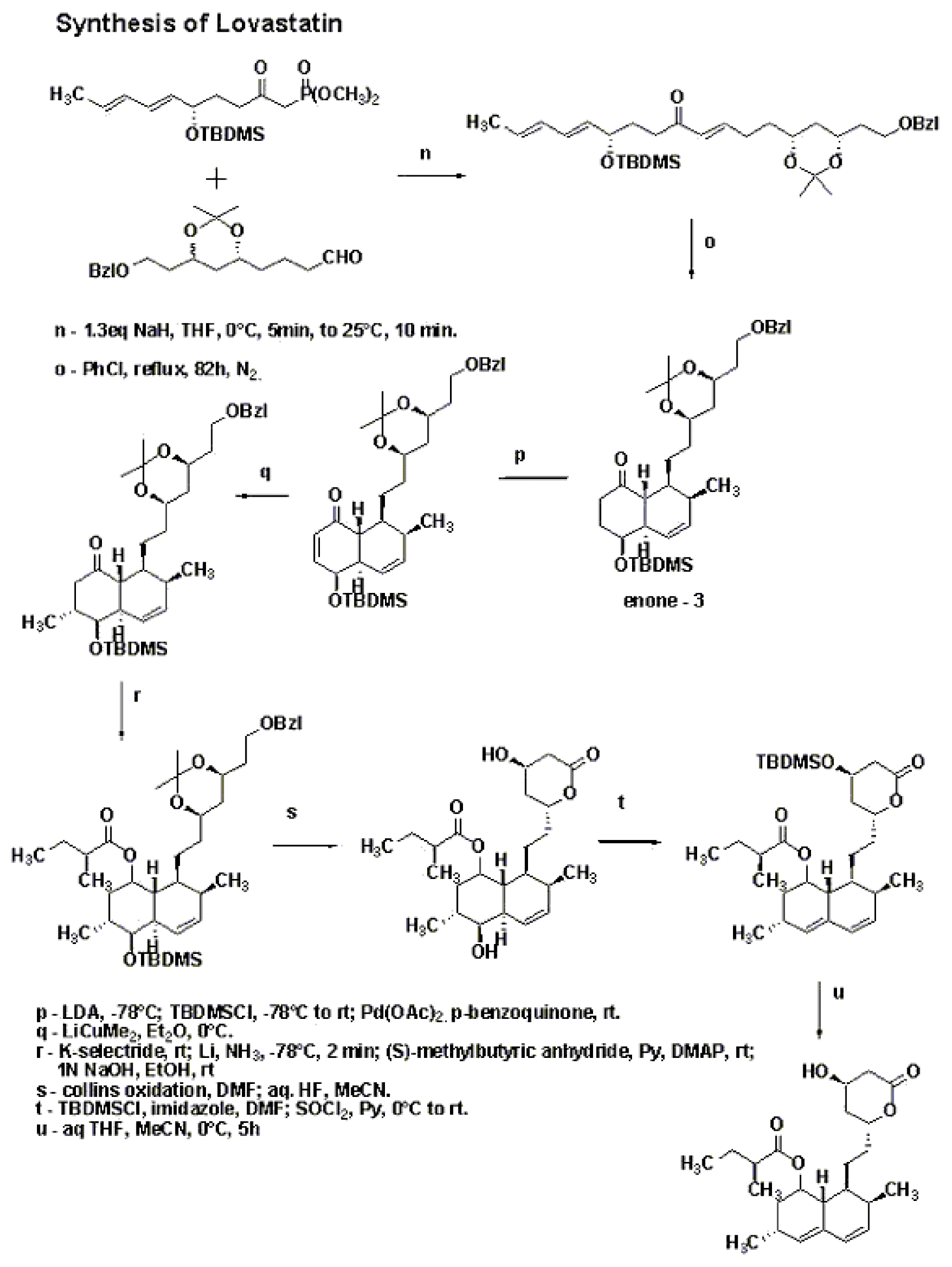
Complete lovastatin synthesis

== Society and culture ==
=== Natural sources ===
Lovastatin is a naturally occurring compound found in low concentrations in food such as oyster mushrooms, red yeast rice, and Pu-erh.

=== Brand names ===
Mevacor, Advicor (as a combination with niacin), Altocor, Altoprev

=== Other applications ===
In plant physiology, lovastatin has occasionally been used as inhibitor of cytokinin biosynthesis.
