= Glossary of sake terms =

This glossary of sake terms lists some of terms and definitions involved in making sake, and some terms which also apply to other beverages such as beer. Sake, also referred to as a Japanese rice wine, is an alcoholic beverage made by fermenting rice that has been polished to remove the bran. Unlike wine, in which alcohol is produced by fermenting sugar that is naturally present in fruit, sake is produced by a brewing process more akin to that of beer, where starch is converted into sugars which ferment into alcohol.

== A ==
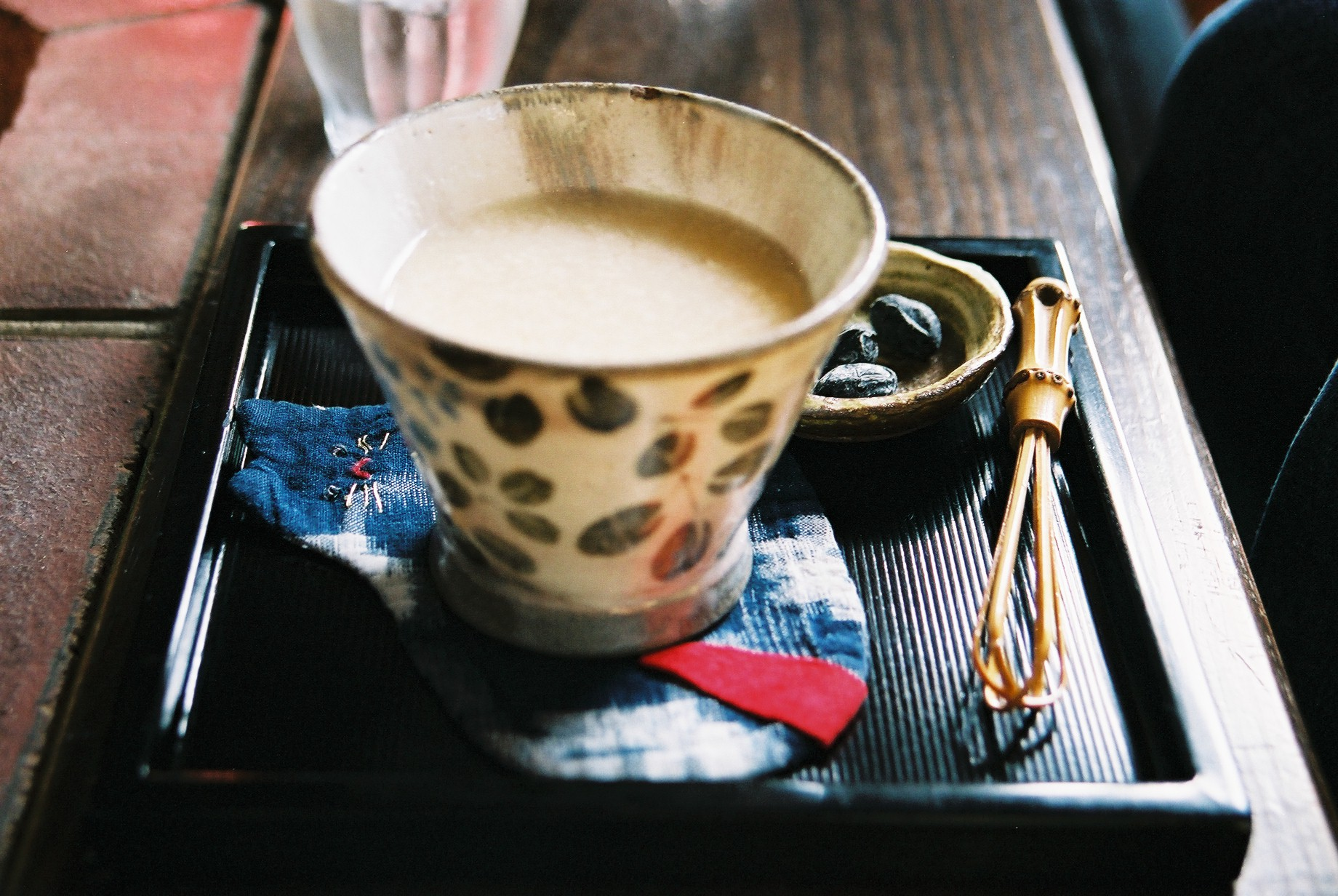
A cup of amazake

Acidity
The quality of sake that gives it its crispiness and vitality. A proper balance of acidity must be struck with the other elements of a sake, or else the sake may be said to be too sharp – having disproportionately high levels of acidity – or too flat – having disproportionately low levels of acidity.
Alcohol
Generally refers to ethanol, a chemical compound found in alcoholic beverages. It is also commonly used to refer to alcoholic beverages in general.
Alcoholic fermentation
The conversion by yeast of sugar into alcohol compounds
Amakuchi 甘口
Sweeter than neutral sake
Amazake 甘酒
A traditional sweet, low-alcoholic Japanese drink made from fermented rice.
Aminosan-do アミノ酸度
The taste of umami or savoriness. As the proportion of amino acids rises, the sake tastes more savory. This number is determined by formol titration of the sake with a mixture of sodium hydroxide solution and formaldehyde, and is equal to the milliliters of 0.1mol/L sodium hydroxide required to neutralize the amino acids in 10 mL of sake.
Atsukan 熱燗
Heated sake; typically only lower-quality sake is served hot, as high heat tends to destroy subtle flavors and aromas. Mostly consumed in cold winter months.

== D ==
Daiginjō-shu 大吟醸酒
Very special brew sake made from highly-polished (polished to 50% or less) rice and fermented at low temperature
Doburoku 濁酒
The classic home-brew style of sake although home brewing is illegal in Japan. It is created by simply adding kōji mold to steamed rice and water and letting the mixture ferment. The resulting sake is somewhat like a chunkier version of nigorizake.

== F ==
Fukumi-ka 含み香
Sake aromas smelled retronasally
Fukurozuri 袋吊り
A method of separating sake from the lees without external pressure by hanging the mash in bags and allowing the liquid to drip out under its own weight. Sake produced this way is sometimes called shizukuzake (雫酒), meaning "drip sake".
Futsū-shu 普通酒
Ordinary sake

== G ==
Genmai 玄米
Unpolished rice
Genshu 原酒
Undiluted sake. Most sake is diluted with water after brewing to lower the alcohol content from 18–20% down to 14–16%, but genshu is not.
Ginjō-shu 吟醸酒
Special brew sake made from rice polished to 60% or less and fermented at low temperature
Gomi 五味
The five flavors (sweet, salty, spicy, sour, bitter)

== H ==
Hi-ire 火入れ
Pasteurization; lit. heating
Hire-zake ひれ酒 or 鰭酒
Hot sake with grilled fish fins, especially fugu or sea bream
Hitohada 人肌 or 人膚
Body temperature sake
Honjōzō-shu 本醸造酒
Sake made from rice, koji, water, and a small amount of added alcohol for balance. Rice polished to 70% or less of its original size.

== I ==
Ichi-go 一合
One serving of sake, about 180ml
Izakaya 居酒屋
Japanese bar that serves sake and other drinks along with bar snacks

== J ==
Jizake 地酒
Locally brewed sake, the equivalent of microbrewing beer.
Jōmai 蒸米
Steamed rice
Jōon 常温
Room temperature sake
Jukusei-ka 熟成香
The scent of maturation
Junmai Daiginjō-shu 純米大吟醸酒
Very special brew sake made only from highly-polished (polished to 50% or less) rice, water and kōji
Junmai-shu 純米酒
Pure sake made only from rice, water, and kōji

== K ==
Kagami biraki 鏡開き
The opening of a Kagami mochi, or to the opening of a cask of sake at a party or ceremony
Kagamiwari 鏡割り
Breaking open a ceremonial sake barrel with wooden mallets
Kakemai 掛け米
Steamed rice which is added to the fermenting moromi
Kanzake 燗酒
Warmed sake
Kanzamashi 燗冷まし
Hot sake that has cooled
Kappu-zake カップ酒
A single serving glass of cheap sake with a pull-off top
Karakuchi 辛口
Dry taste of sake
Kassei seishu 活性清酒
"Active sake" with secondary fermentation in bottle like Champagne and potentially explosive effervescence upon opening
Kashira 頭
The second-in-command at the brewery, responsible for daily brewing operations
Kasu 粕
Pressed sake lees, the solids left after pressing and filtering. These are used for making pickles, livestock feed, and shōchū, and as an ingredient in dishes like kasu soup.
Katakuchi 片口
Wide sake decanter made of ceramic, glass or metal
Kijōshu 貴醸酒
A complex sake that is made by replacing some of the water used in brewing with sake
Kimoto 生酛
The traditional orthodox method for preparing the starter mash, which includes the laborious process of grinding it into a paste. This method was the standard for 300 years, but it is rare today.
Kōbo 酵母
Yeast
Kōchūka 口中香
Aroma of sake in the mouth experienced retronasally
Kodaishu 古代酒
Dark and funky sake brewed according to ancestral methods
Kōji 麹
Rice made with kōjikin
Kōji-bana 麹バナ
A nutty aroma caused by the sake mold unique to freshly pressed, non-pasteurized sake
Kōjikin 麹菌
The mold Aspergillus oryzae used to break down rice starches into fermentable sugars, and then into alcohol
Koku 石 or 斛
Traditional unit of volume, approx. 180.4 litres, used to measure rice
Koshiki 甑
Steaming basket
Koshu 古酒
"Aged sake". Most sake does not age well, but this specially made type can age for decades, turning yellow and acquiring a honeyed flavor.
Kuchiatari 口当たり
The immediate first impression upon sake hitting the palate
Kura 蔵 or 倉 or 庫
Sake cellar
Kurabito 蔵人 or 藏人
Sake cellar worker
Kuroshu 黒酒
Sake made from unpolished rice (brown rice), and is more like Chinese rice wine.

== M ==
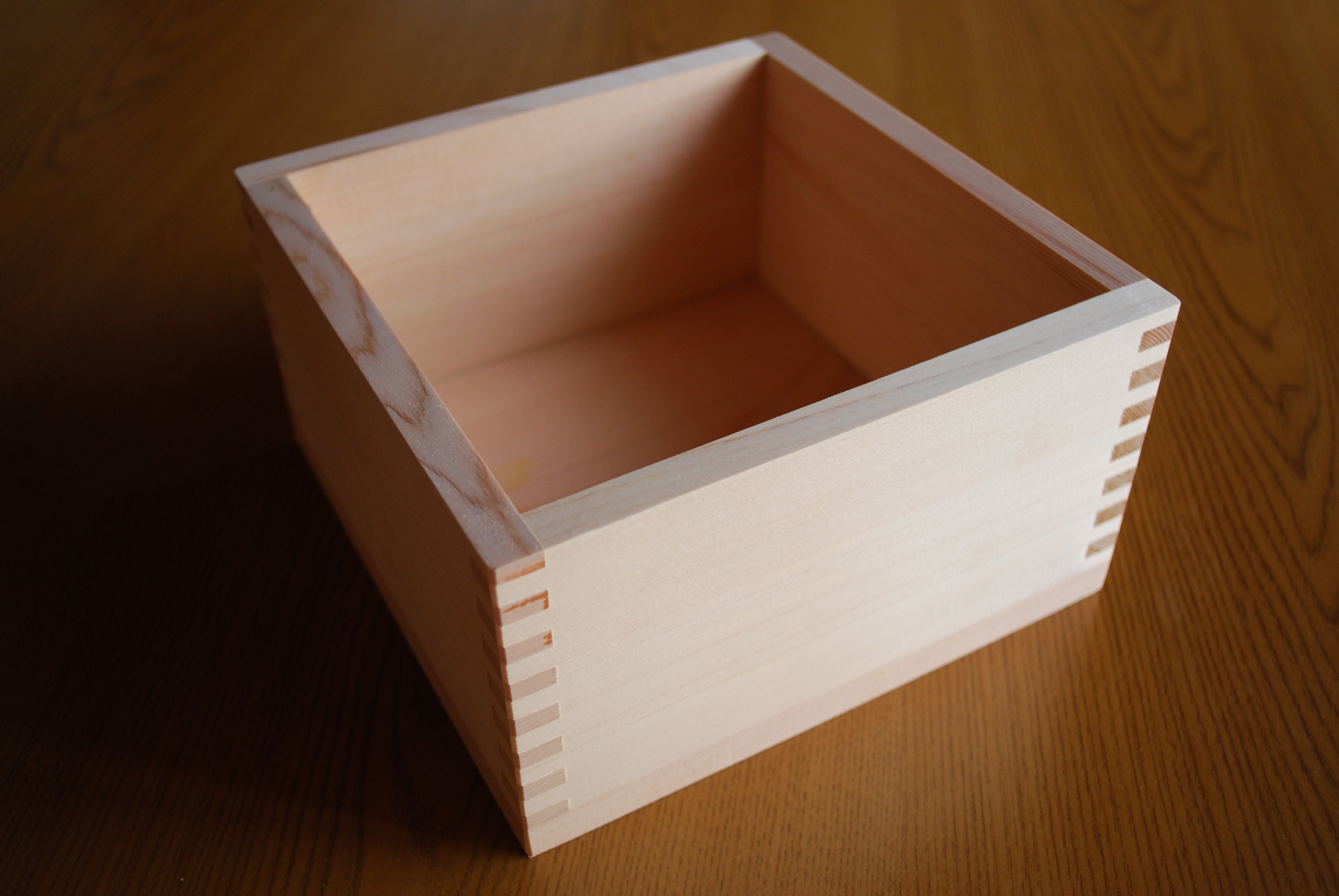
Masu

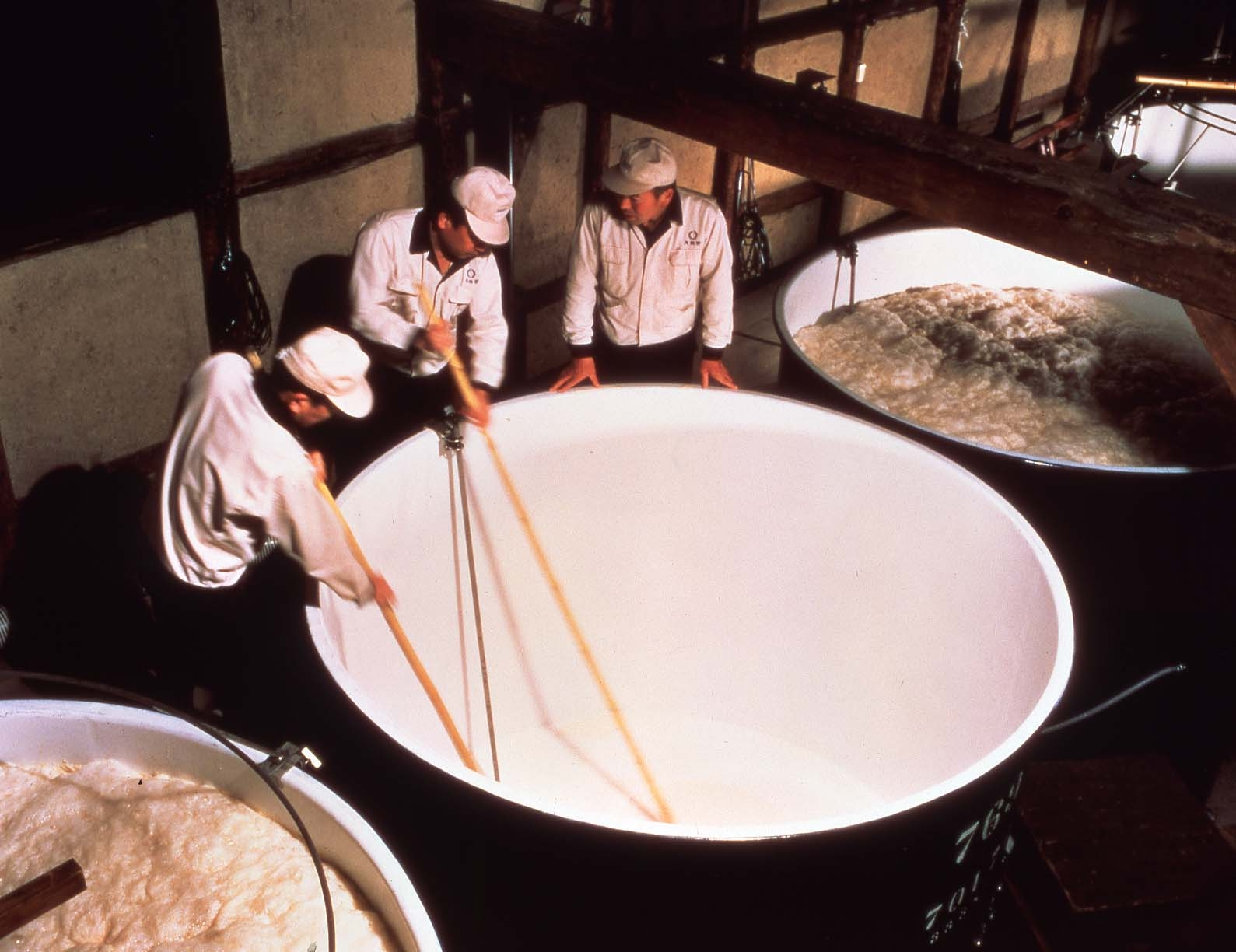
Moromi, the main mash

Masu 枡 or 升
Originally a square wooden box used to measure rice during the feudal period. Masu existed in many sizes, typically covering the range from one to (一斗枡 ittomasu, c. 18 L) to one gō (一合枡 ichigōmasu, c. 0.18 L). Today masu are largely used for drinking sake, as the advent of modern rice cookers and a higher calorie diet in Japan has made them impractical for measuring portions of rice, and the standard size is one gō, or 0.18039 L.
Moto 酛
Yeast starter
Moromi 諸味 or 醪
Main fermenting mash in production of sake or soy sauce
Muroka 無濾過
Unfiltered sake that has not been carbon filtered, but which has been pressed and separated from the lees, and thus is clear, not cloudy. Carbon filtration can remove desirable flavors and odors as well as bad ones, thus muroka sake has stronger flavors than filtered varieties.
Mushimai 蒸し米
Steamed rice

== N ==
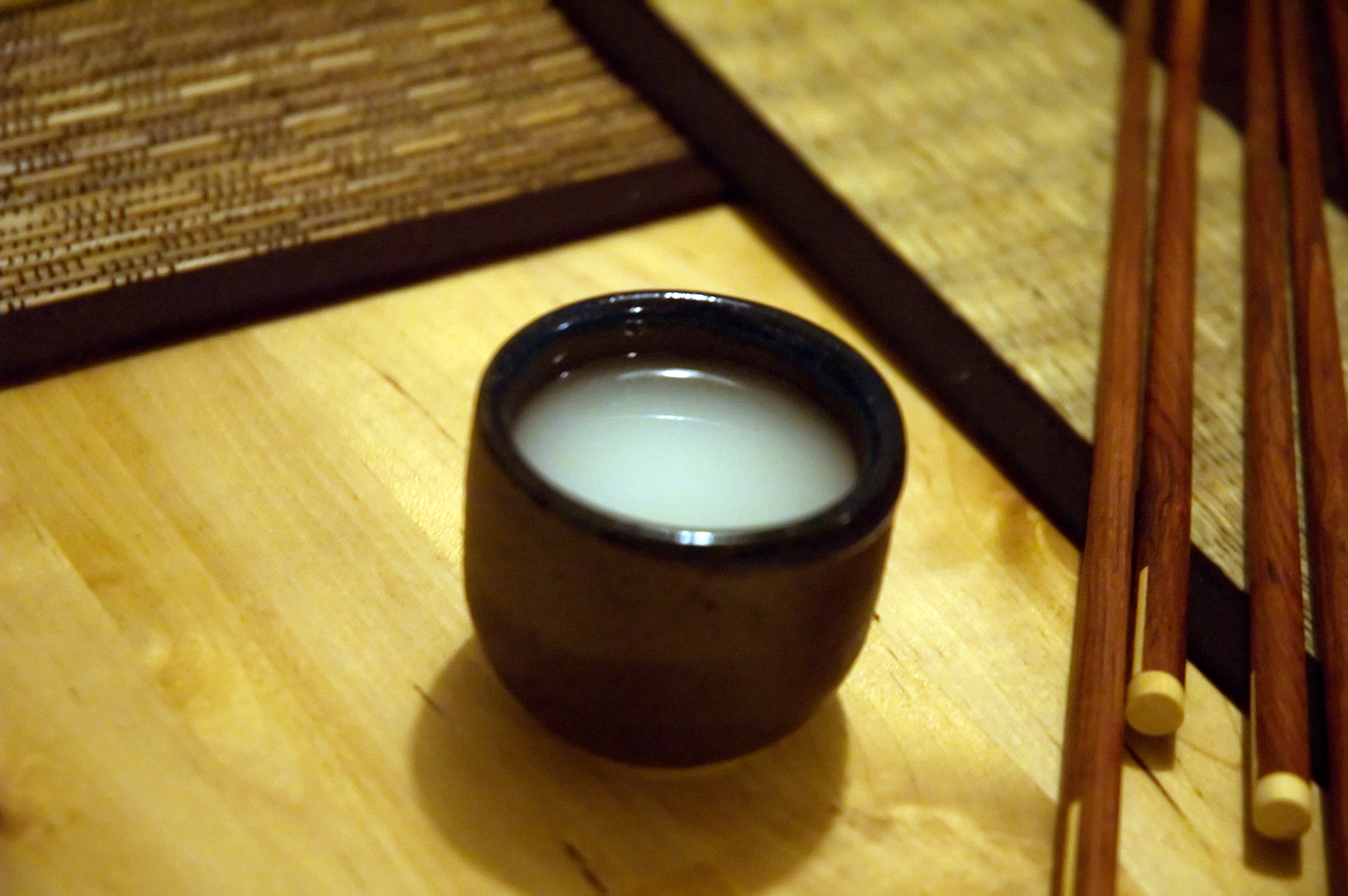
Nigorizake

Namagusai 生臭い or 腥い
Raw fish smell or taste, amplified in sushi tasting when beer or some wines are consumed rather than sake
Nama Chozōshu 生貯蔵酒
Essentially a semi-Namazake, this sake is stored unpasteurized and heated only once before shipping to conserve the nama freshness while reducing the risk of spoilage
Namazake 生酒
Sake that has not been pasteurized. It requires refrigerated storage and has a shorter shelf-life than pasteurized sake.
Nigorizake 濁り酒
Cloudy sake. The sake is passed through a loose mesh to separate it from the mash. It is not filtered thereafter and there is much rice sediment in the bottle. Before serving, the bottle is shaken to mix the sediment and turn the sake white or cloudy.
Nihonshu 日本酒
Lit. "Japanese liquor", a more specific term than sake, which can mean any kind of alcohol
Nihonshu-do 日本酒度
Calculated from the specific gravity of the sake, and used to indicate the sugar and alcohol content of the sake on an arbitrary scale. Typical values are between −3 (sweet) and +10 (dry), equivalent to specific gravities ranging between 1.007 and 0.998
Nuka 糠
Powder that has been polished away from rice kernels

== O ==
O-choko お猪口
Small, cylindrical sake cup
Orizake 澱酒
A sake with barely visible sediment

== R ==
Regyura-shu レギュラー酒
Basic, cheap sake, typically with less-complex aromas and flavors, and sometimes with added sugars
Reishu 冷酒
Chilled sake
Roka 濾過
The filtering process

== S ==
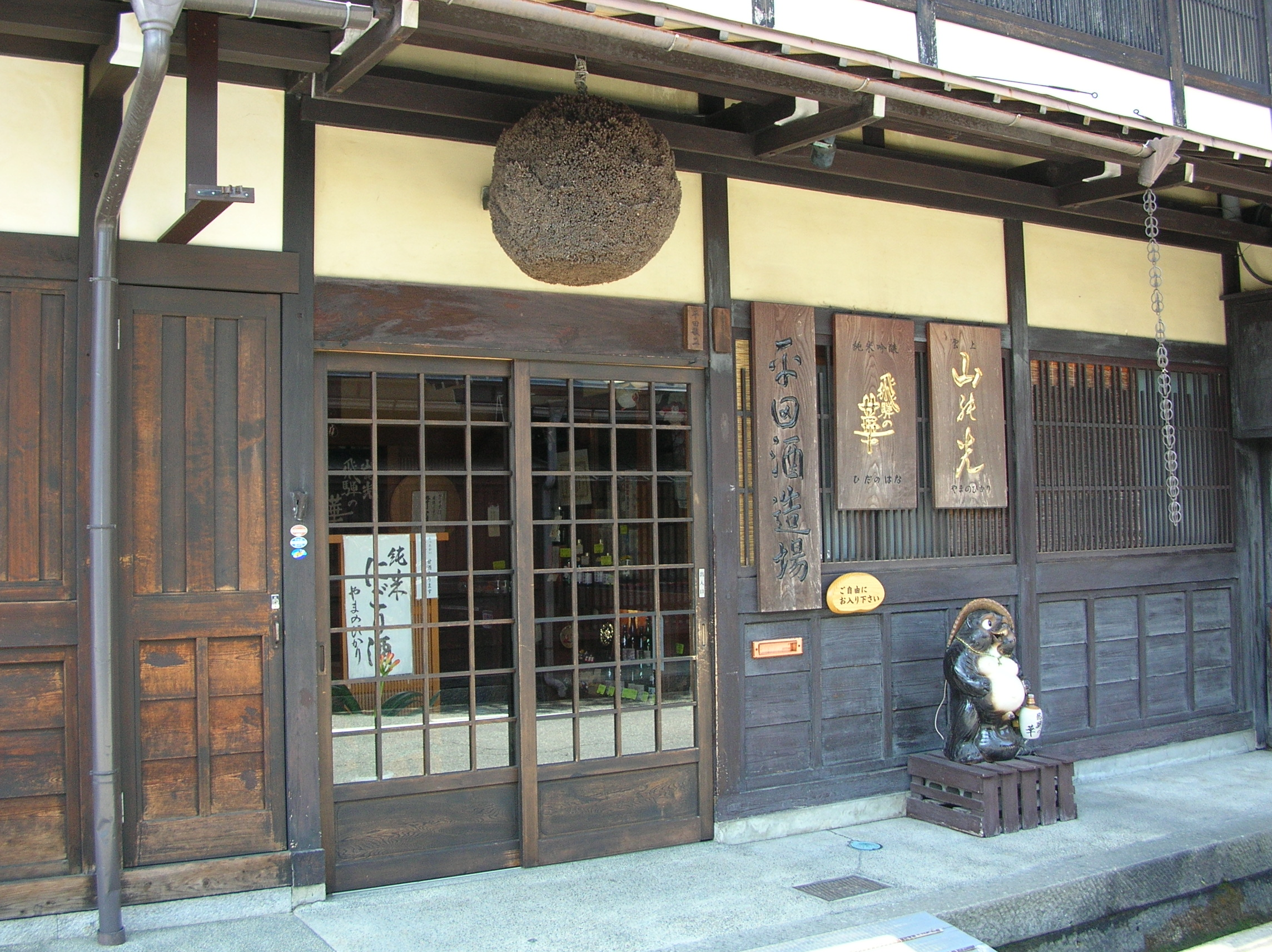
Sake brewery with a hanging sugidama, a ball of cedar leaves

Sakagura 酒蔵 or 酒倉
Sake brewery
Sakana 肴
Appetizer or snack served with alcoholic drinks
Sakaya 酒屋
Liquor store; wine shop; sake dealer
Sakazuki 杯 or 酒盃
A small porcelain cup for sake
Saketini
A cocktail that uses sake as its base, along with other ingredients such as simple syrups, distilled spirits, liqueurs, juices and garnishes. The name saketini is a portmanteau of "sake" and "martini".
Sandan shikomi 三段仕込み
A common 3-stage process of adding rice, kōji, and water to the moromi
San-do 酸度
The concentration of acid, which is determined by titration with sodium hydroxide solution. This number is equal to the milliliters of 0.1M NaOH titrant required to neutralize the acid in 10 mL (0.35 imp fl oz; 0.34 US fl oz) of sake.
Sanyaku 三役
The three brewery workers responsible for the yeast starter, a term derived from sumō
Seimai 精米
Rice polishing
Seimai-buai 精米歩合
The rice polishing ratio, the percentage of weight remaining after polishing. Generally, the lower the number, the better the sake's potential. A lower percentage usually results in a fruitier sake, whereas a higher percentage will taste more like rice.
Seimaiki 精米機
Rice huller; rice polishing machine
Seishu 清酒
Lit. "clear liquor", the legal term for sake printed on all sake labels.
Shiboritate 搾立て
"Freshly pressed", refers to sake that has been shipped without the traditional six-month aging/maturation period. The result is usually a more acidic, "greener" sake.
Shimpaku 芯白
The opaque, white center of a polished rice kernel
Shinseki 浸漬
Rice soaking
Shinshu 新酒
"New sake", sake released in late winter or early spring
Shinshu-bana 新酒バナ
New sake aroma, young, green, ripe aromas
Shizukuzake 雫酒
"Drip sake", a method of separating sake from the lees without external pressure by hanging the mash in bags and allowing the liquid to drip out under its own weight by gravity.
Shubo 酒母
Lit. "mother of sake", yeast mash; yeast starter
Sokujō 速醸
"Quick fermentation", is a method of preparing the starter mash, invented in late Meiji Period (around 1900) by Eda Kenjiro. Lactic acid, produced naturally in the two slower traditional methods, is added to the starter to inhibit unwanted bacteria. Sokujō sake tends to have a lighter flavor than kimoto or yamahai.
Sugidama 杉玉
Ball made from the leaves of Japanese cedar (杉, sugi), traditionally hung in the eaves of sake breweries

== T ==
Tamagozake 卵酒 or 玉子酒
A cocktail consisting of heated sake, sugar and a raw egg
Taruzake 樽酒
Sake aged in wooden barrels or bottled in wooden casks. The wood used is Cryptomeria (杉, sugi), which is also known as Japanese cedar. Sake casks are often tapped ceremonially for the opening of buildings, businesses, parties, etc. Because the wood imparts a strong flavor, premium sake is rarely used for this type.
Teiseihaku-shu 低精白酒
Sake with a deliberately high rice-polishing ratio. It is generally held that the lower the rice polishing ratio (the percent weight after polishing), the better the potential of the sake. However, beginning around 2005, teiseihaku-shu has been produced as a specialty sake made with high rice-polishing ratios, usually around 80%, to produce sake with the characteristic flavor of rice itself.
Tejaku 手酌
The faux pas of pouring one's own drink
Tobingakoi 斗瓶囲い
Sake pressed into one to (斗, 18-liter (4.0 imp gal; 4.8 U.S. gal)) bottles (斗瓶, "tobin") with the brewer selecting the best sake of the batch for shipping.
Tōji 杜氏
The head sake brewer at a sake brewery
Tokubetsu Honjōzō-shu 特別本醸造酒
Special Genuine brew, to differentiate from a brewery's regular Honjōzō
Tokubetsu Junmai-shu 特別純米酒
Special pure rice sake made with rice polished to 60% or less of its original size. Costs more than a brewery's regular junmai.
Tokkuri 徳利
Sake bottle which is tall and slender with a narrow mouth made from ceramic, metal or glass
Tokutei meishō-shu 特定名称酒
Special-designation sake, collectively referring to honjōzō-shu, junmaishu, and ginjoshu

== U ==
Umami 旨味 or うまみ
Fundamental flavor arising from glutamates, found in sake, tomatoes, cheese, meat, etc.
Uwadachi-ka 上立ち香
The initial smell of sake as the most volatile aromatic compounds rise from the glass

== Y ==
Yamahai 山廃
a simplified version of the kimoto method, introduced in the early 1900s. Yamahai skips the step of making a paste out of the starter mash. That step of the kimoto method is known as yama-oroshi, and the full name for yamahai is "yama-oroshi haishi" (山卸廃止), meaning "discontinuation of yama-oroshi." While the yamahai method was originally developed to speed production time, it is slower than the modern method and is now used only in specialty brews for the earthy flavors it produces.
Yongōbin 四合瓶
a 720ml bottle of alcohol, literally a "four gō bottle"

== See also ==
- Glossary of viticulture terms
- Glossary of winemaking terms
- Glossary of wine terms
- Sake set
