= Sugidama =

Object made by shaping Japanese cedar leaves

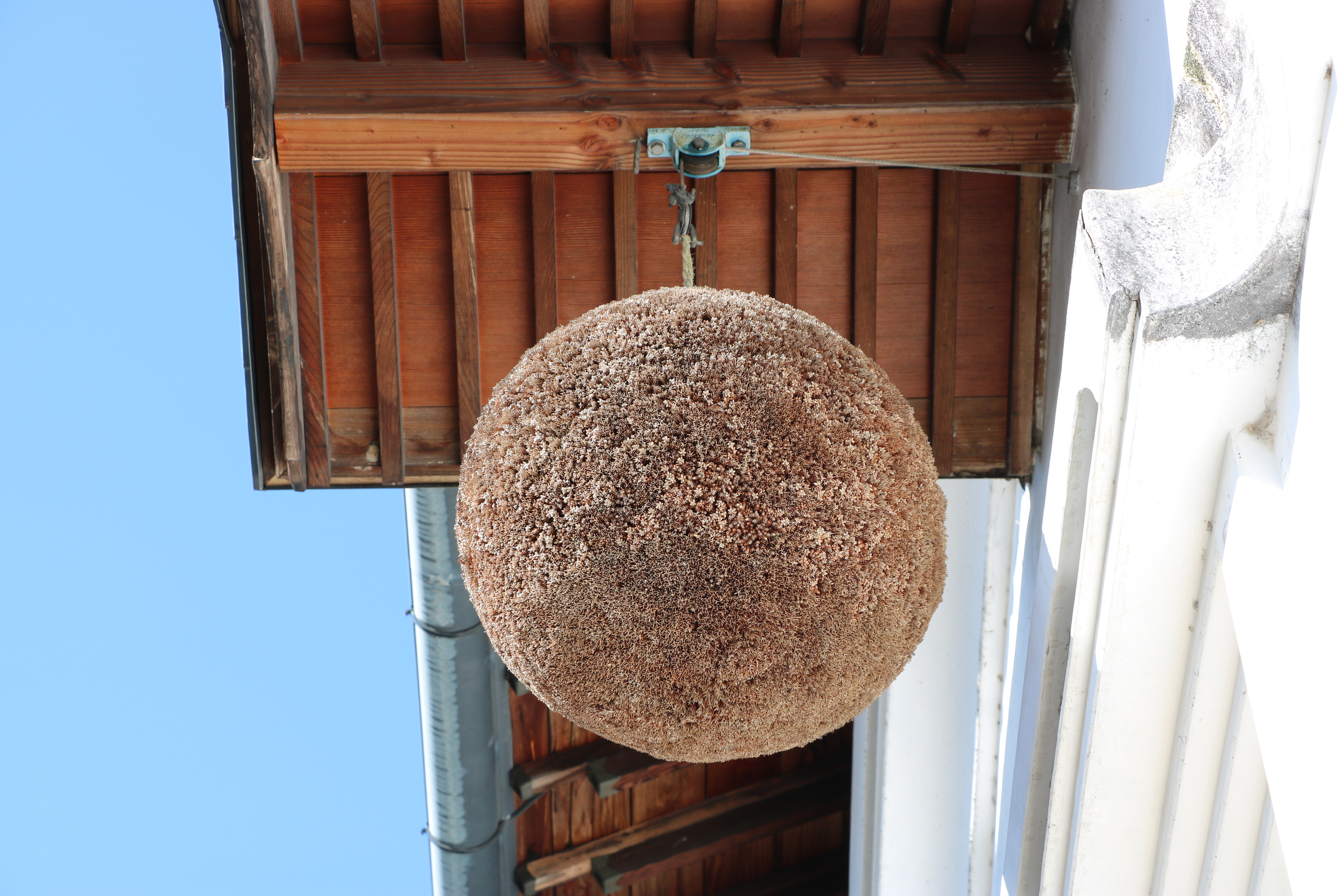
A sugidama at Senjō Sake Brewery in Ina, Nagano Prefecture

A sugidama (杉玉), or sakabayashi (酒林), is an object of Japanese origin made by shaping sugi (Cryptomeria) leaves into a ball. Green sugidama are hung from the eaves of sake breweries to indicate that new sake is ready.

== Origin ==
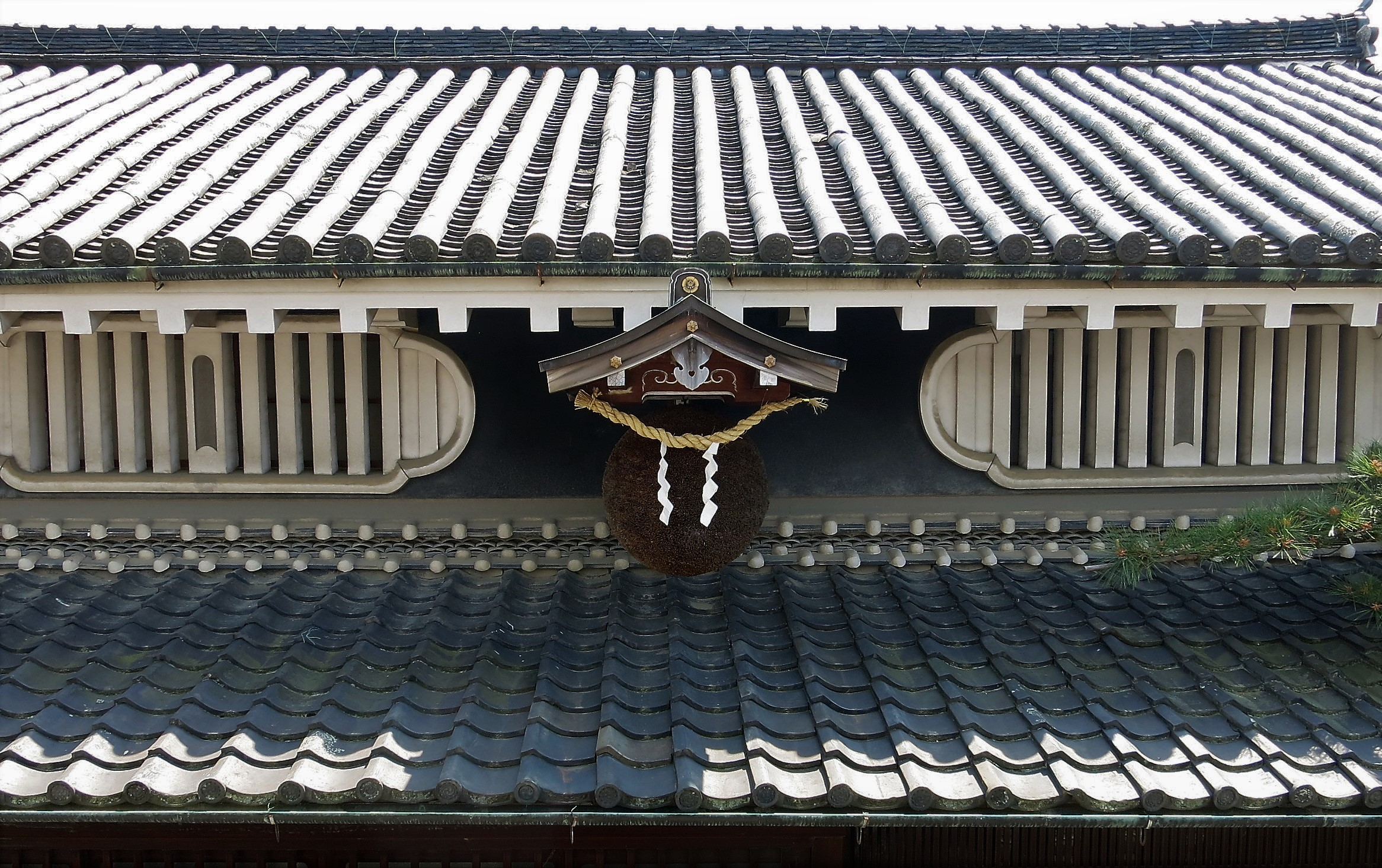
The birthplace of sugidama, Yucho Shuzo in Gose, Nara Prefecture

It is said that sugidama originated from the Ōmiwa Shrine in Nara Prefecture, which is dedicated to the god of sake. Every year on November 14, the Ōmiwa Shrine decorated a sugi leaf ball with a wish for the production of delicious sake, and this custom spread to sake breweries throughout Japan from the early Edo period (1603-1868). It is believed that sugidama were created because sugi trees grow abundantly in the area around Mount Miwa, where the Ōmiwa Shrine is located, and because the sugi trees of Mount Miwa are considered sacred. Originally, it was customary to display sugidama made from the sugi leaves from Mount Miwa, but since modern times, sake breweries around Japan often make their own sugidama or commission them to be made by a vendor.

== Culture ==
The sugidama are usually displayed from February to March, which is the season for new sake production, and are used as a sign that "new sake has been made this year, too." The freshly hung sugidama are still verdant, but they eventually wither and turn brown. The green color from February to June indicates the season for new sake, the light green color from the early summer indicates natsuzake (summer sake), and the withered brown color from fall indicates hiyaoroshi (winter sake aged over the summer). Like this, the color of the sugidama is in sync with the sake brewing season, and the changing color of the balls tells people how the new sake has matured.

The waka poem "Gokuraku wa doko no sato to omohishi ni sugiba tatetaru mataroku ga kado," by Ikkyū, is a poem about a sugidama.

== Gallery ==
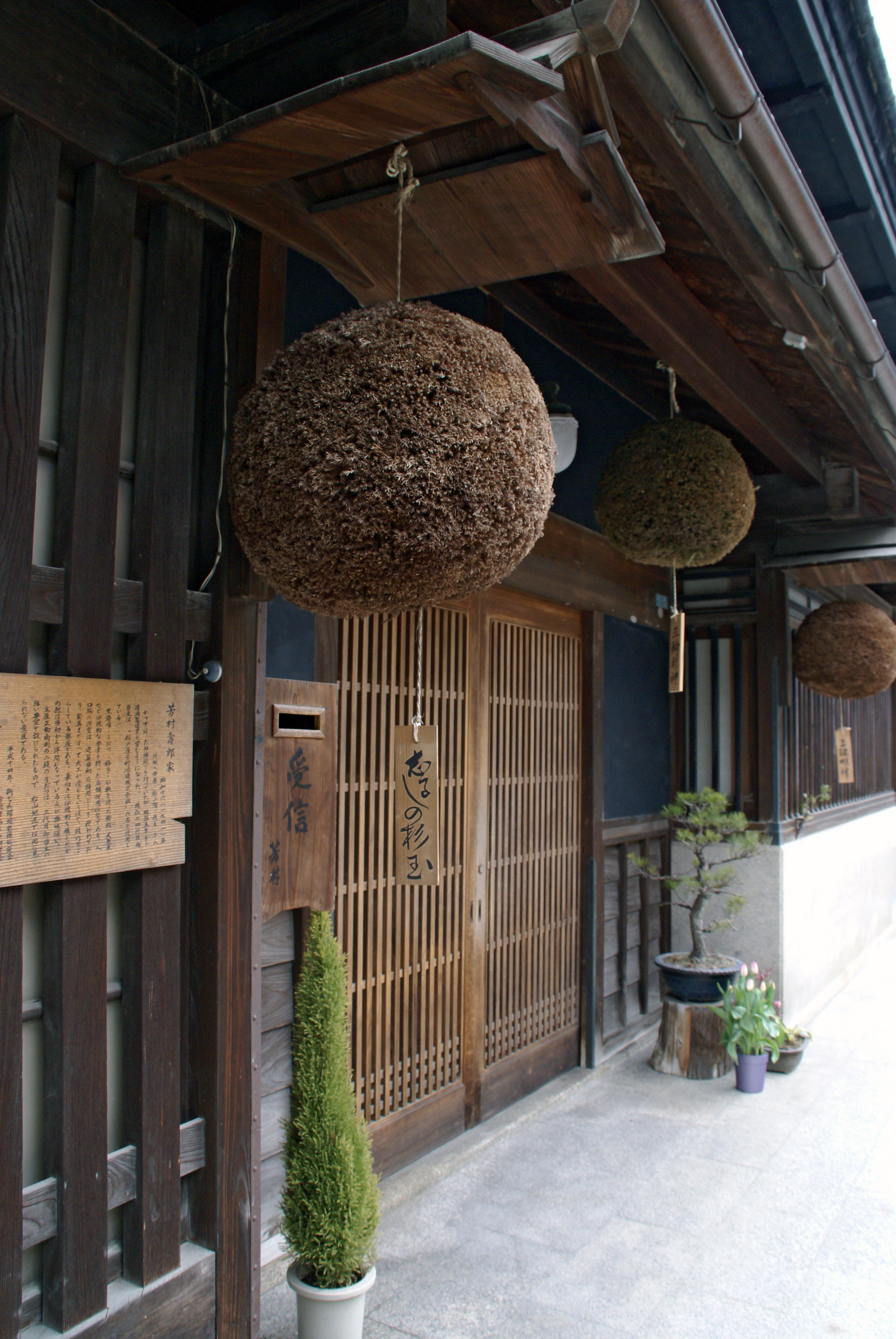
Sugidama at the entrance of a sake brewery in Uda, Nara Prefecture

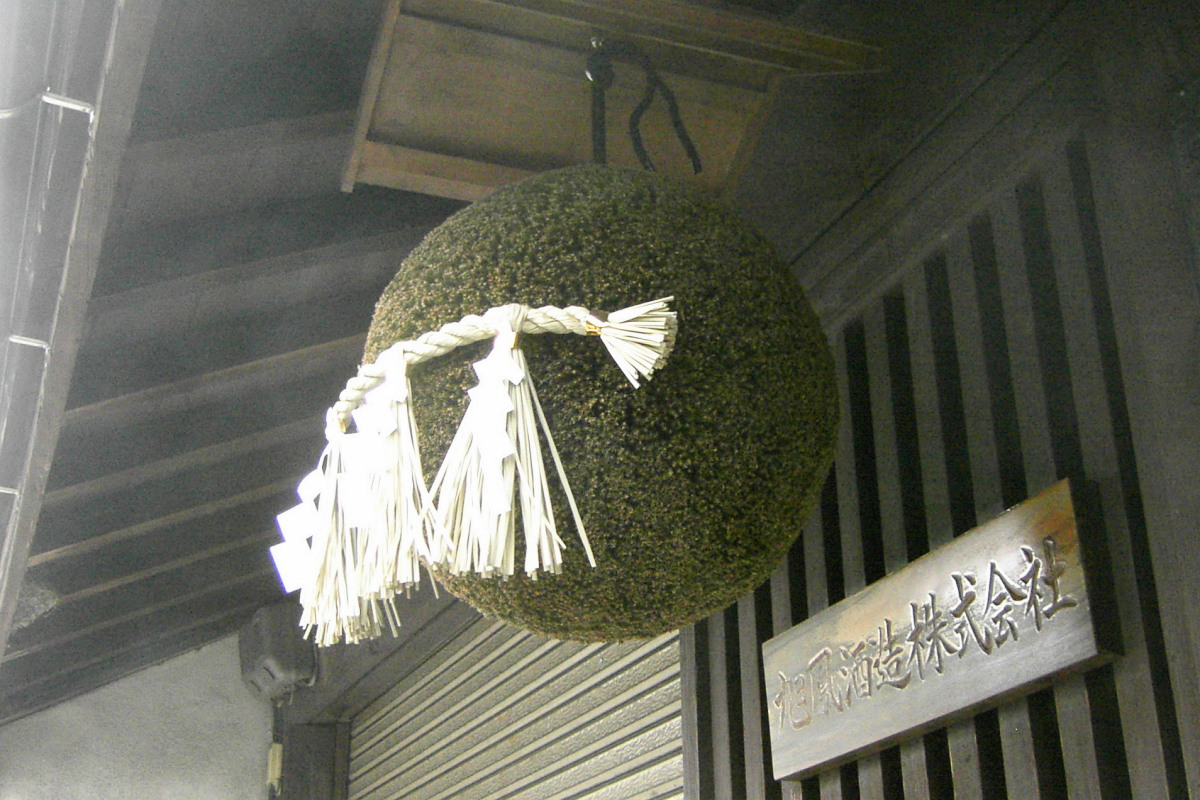
A green sugidama

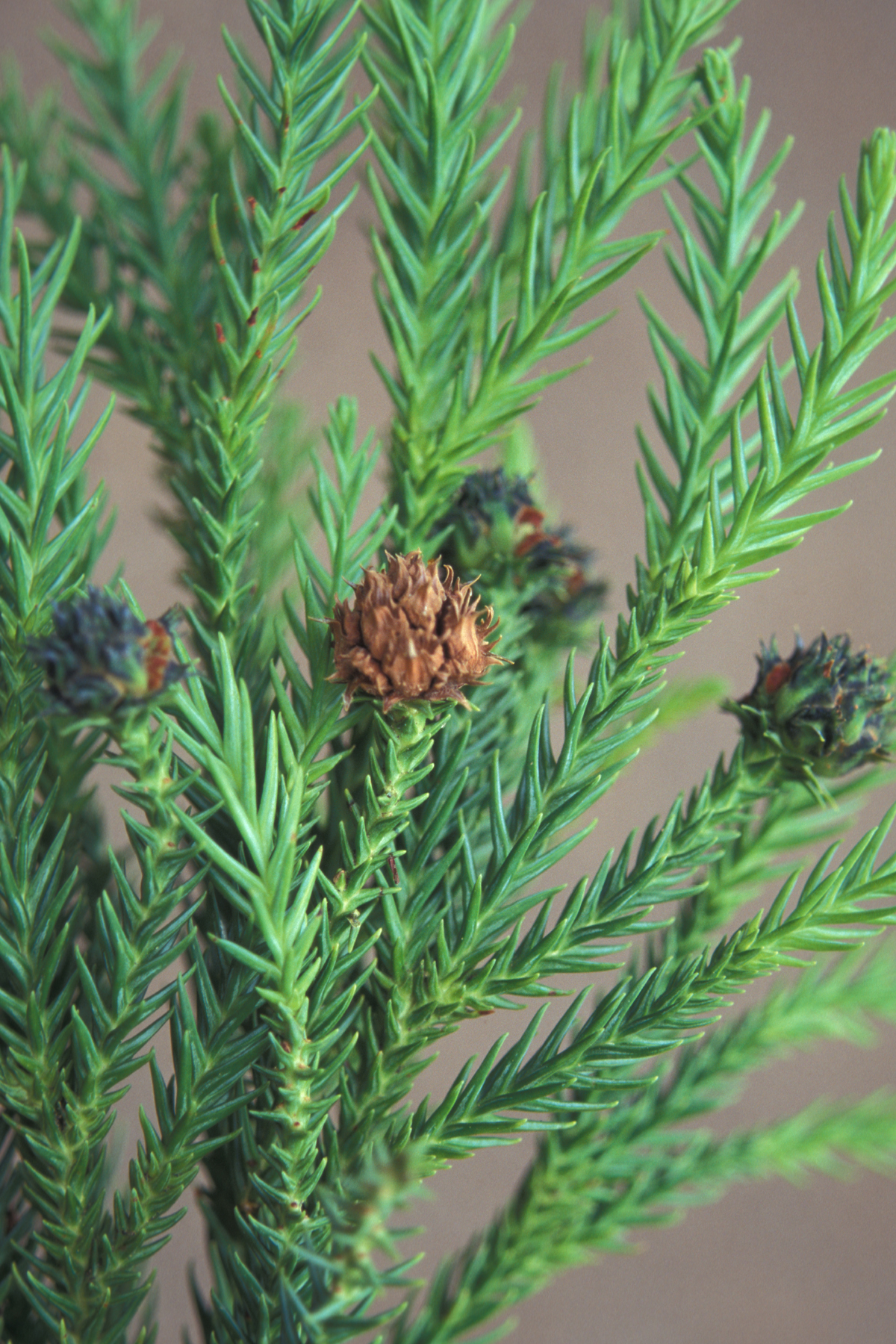
Tips of a sugi (Cryptomeria japonica)

== See also ==
- Sake
- Glossary of sake terms
