= List of soy-based foods =

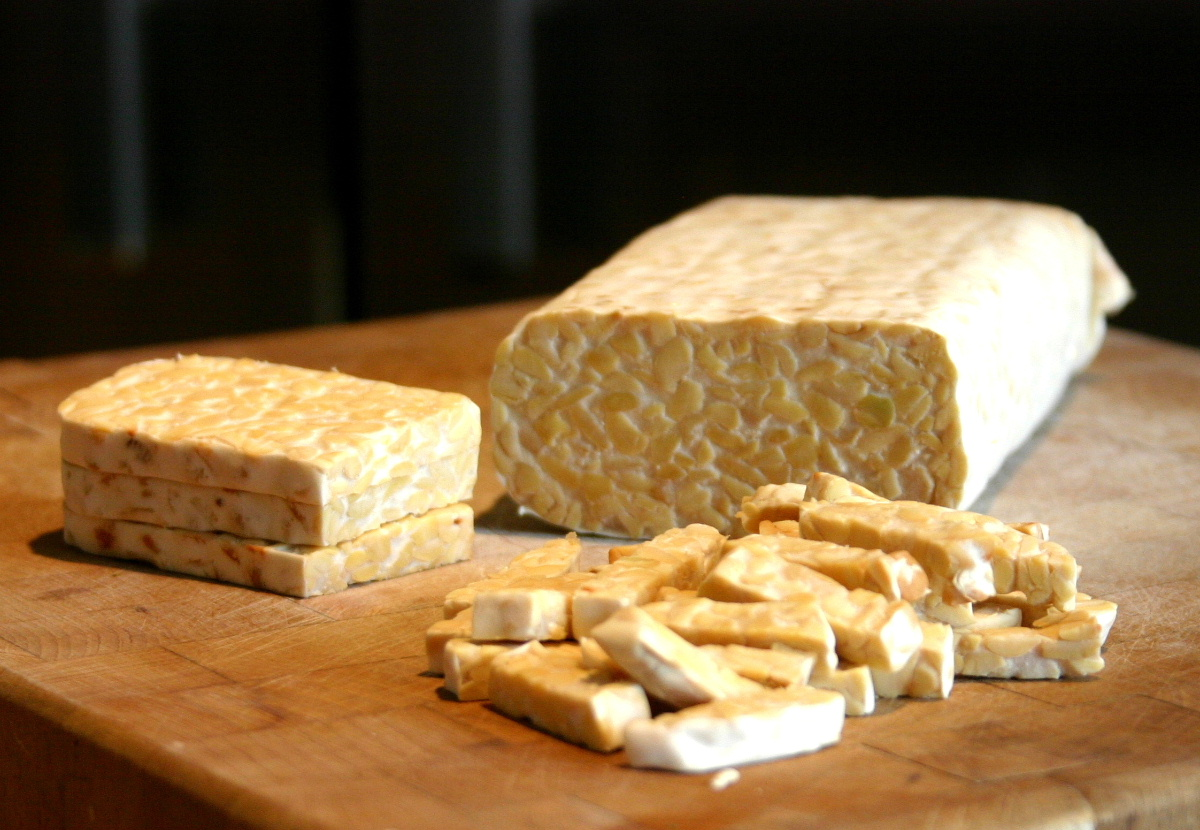
Sliced tempeh

This is a list of soy-based foods. The soybean is a species of legume native to East Asia, widely grown for its edible bean which has numerous uses. The plant is classed as an oilseed rather than a pulse by the UN Food and Agriculture Organization (FAO). Many foods and dishes are prepared using soybeans as a primary ingredient.

== Soy-based foods ==
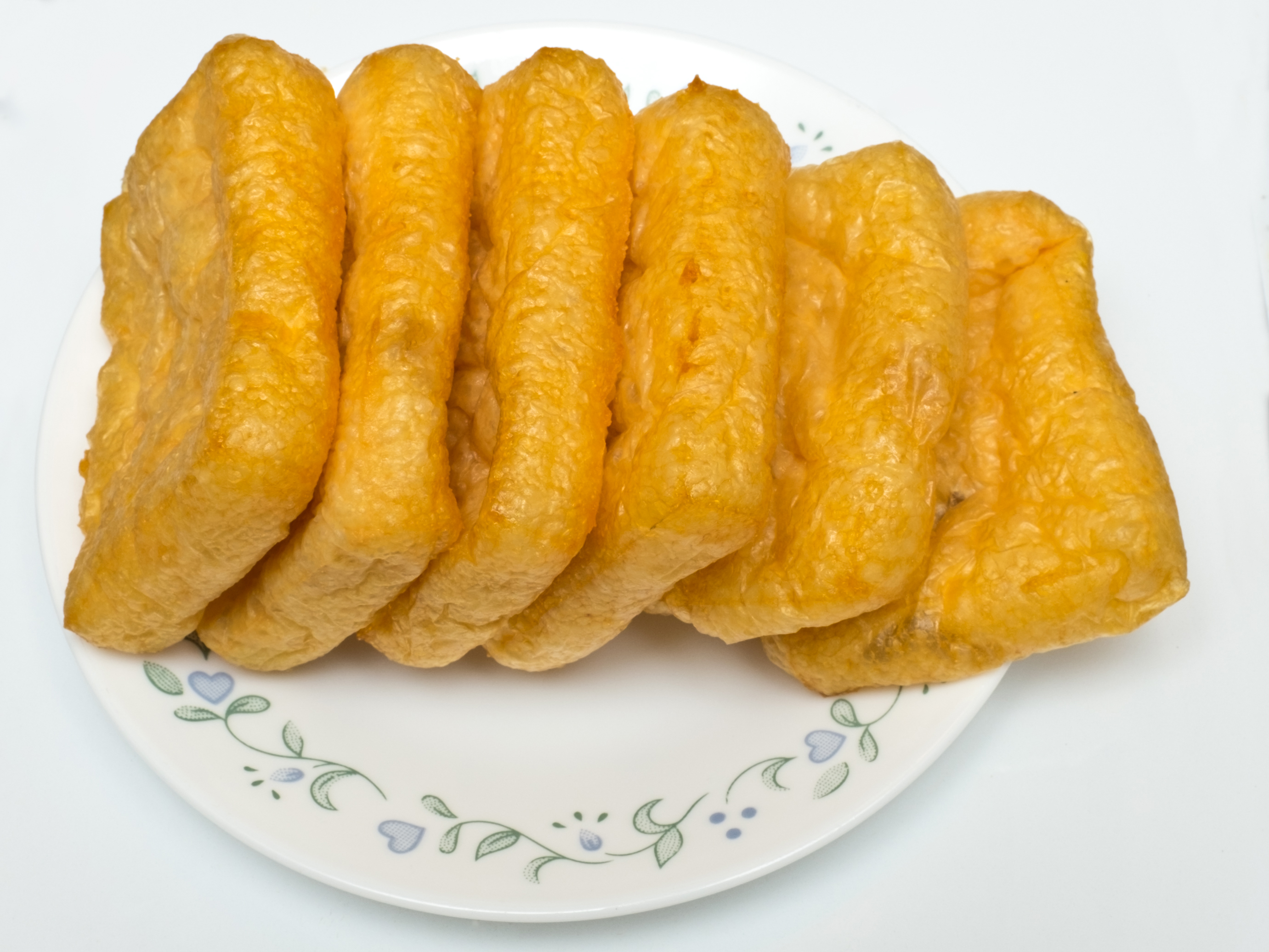
Aburaage is a Japanese food product made from soybeans.

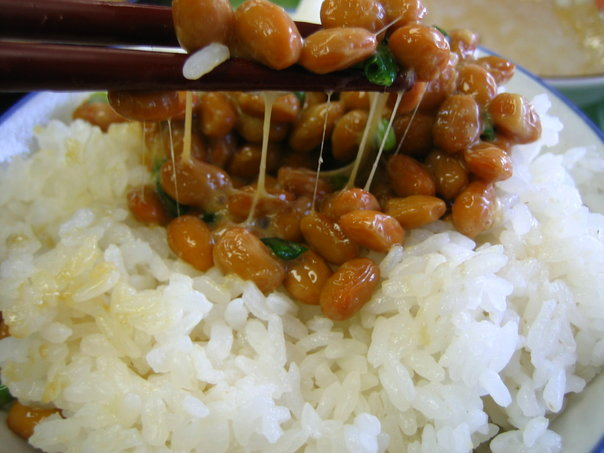
Nattō typically is eaten with rice.

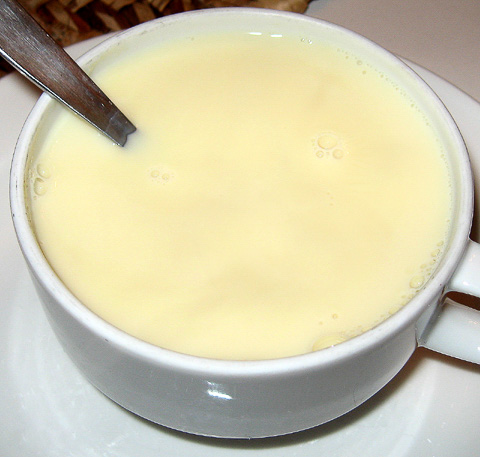
A cup of hot soy milk

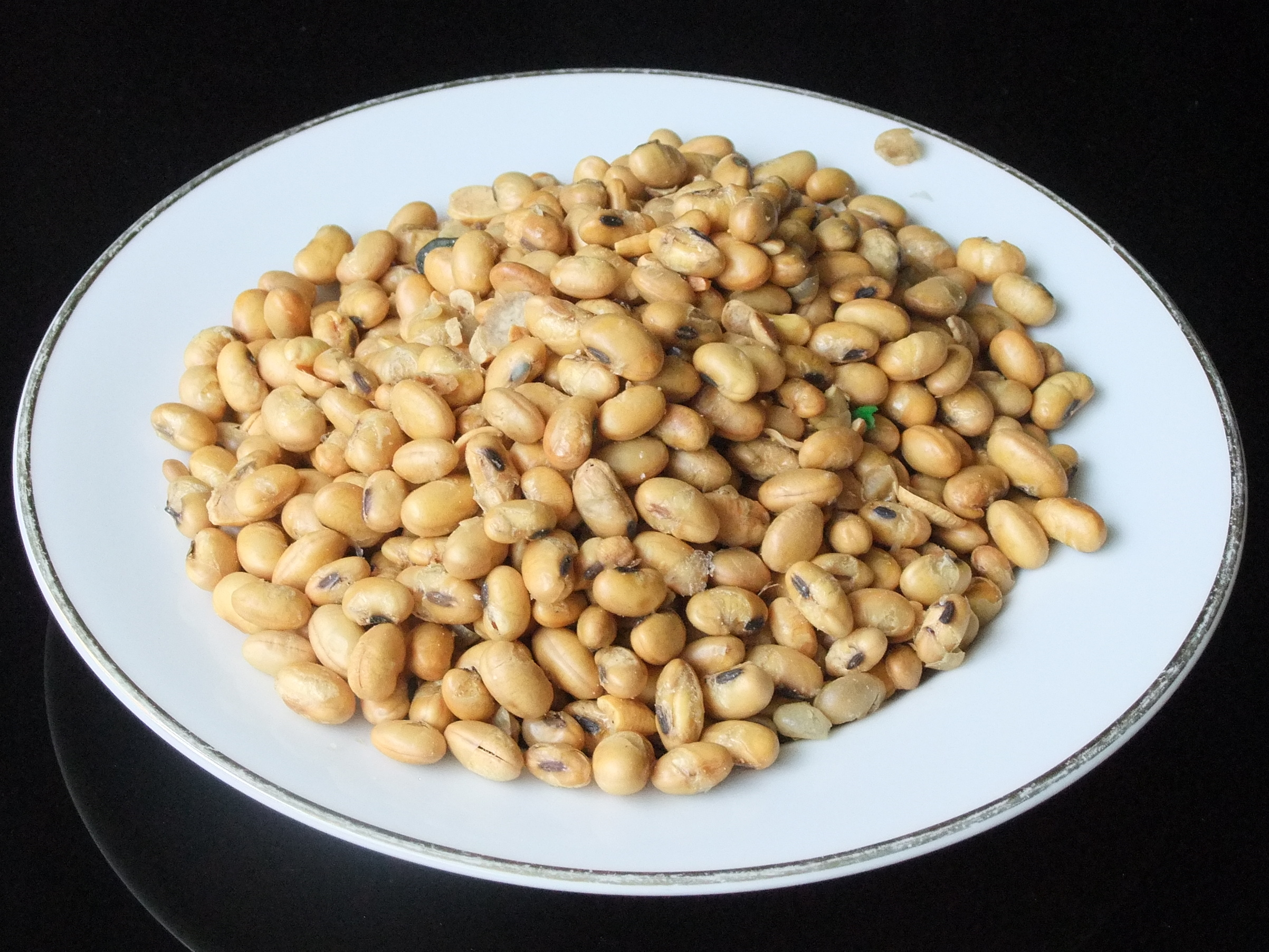
Soy nuts

- Abura-age – Deep-fried tofu slices
- Cheonggukjang – Korean fermented soybeans
- Doenjang – Fermented soybean paste
- Doubanjiang – Chinese spicy bean paste
- Douchi – Fermented and salted black soybeans
- Dougan – Firm variety of tofu
- Edamame – Immature soybean pod used as a specialty food
- Fermented bean paste – Fermented foods made from ground soybeans
- Kinako – Roasted soybean flour
- Kinema – Nepali fermented soybean
- Koya dofu – Type of tofu
- Lufu (food) – Type of fermented bean curd
- Mamenori – Thin wrappers of soybean paper used as a substitute for nori
- Miso – Traditional Japanese seasoning
- Nattō – Japanese food made from fermented soybeans
- Okara (food) – Byproduct of soy milk and tofu production
- Oncom – Indonesian traditional fermented dish
- Soup soy sauce – Type of Korean soy sauce
- Soybean – Legume grown for its edible bean
- Soybean oil – Type of vegetable oil
- Soybean sprout – Culinary vegetable
- Soy milk – Beverage made from soybeans
- Soy molasses – Viscous syrup with a typical bittersweet flavor
- Soy nut – Soaked, drained and baked soybeans
- Soy protein – Protein isolated from soybean
- Soy sauce – East Asian liquid condiment
- Soy yogurt – Yogurt-like product prepared with soy milk
- Sweet bean sauce – Sweet savory sauce in China and Korea
- Tauco – Indonesian fermented bean paste
- Tempeh – Soy product from Java, Indonesia
- Textured vegetable protein – Defatted soy flour food product
- Thua nao – Traditional Shan food made from fermented soybeans
- Tofu – Soy-based food used as a protein source
  - Fermented bean curd – Chinese condiment
  - Stinky tofu – Chinese fermented tofu with a strong odor
  - Tofu skin – Chinese and Japanese food made from soybeans
    - Fuzhu – Chinese soybean product
    - Tofu skin roll – Chinese wrap dish
- Tương – Condiment made from soybeans
- Yellow soybean paste – Chinese fermented soybean paste

=== Dishes ===
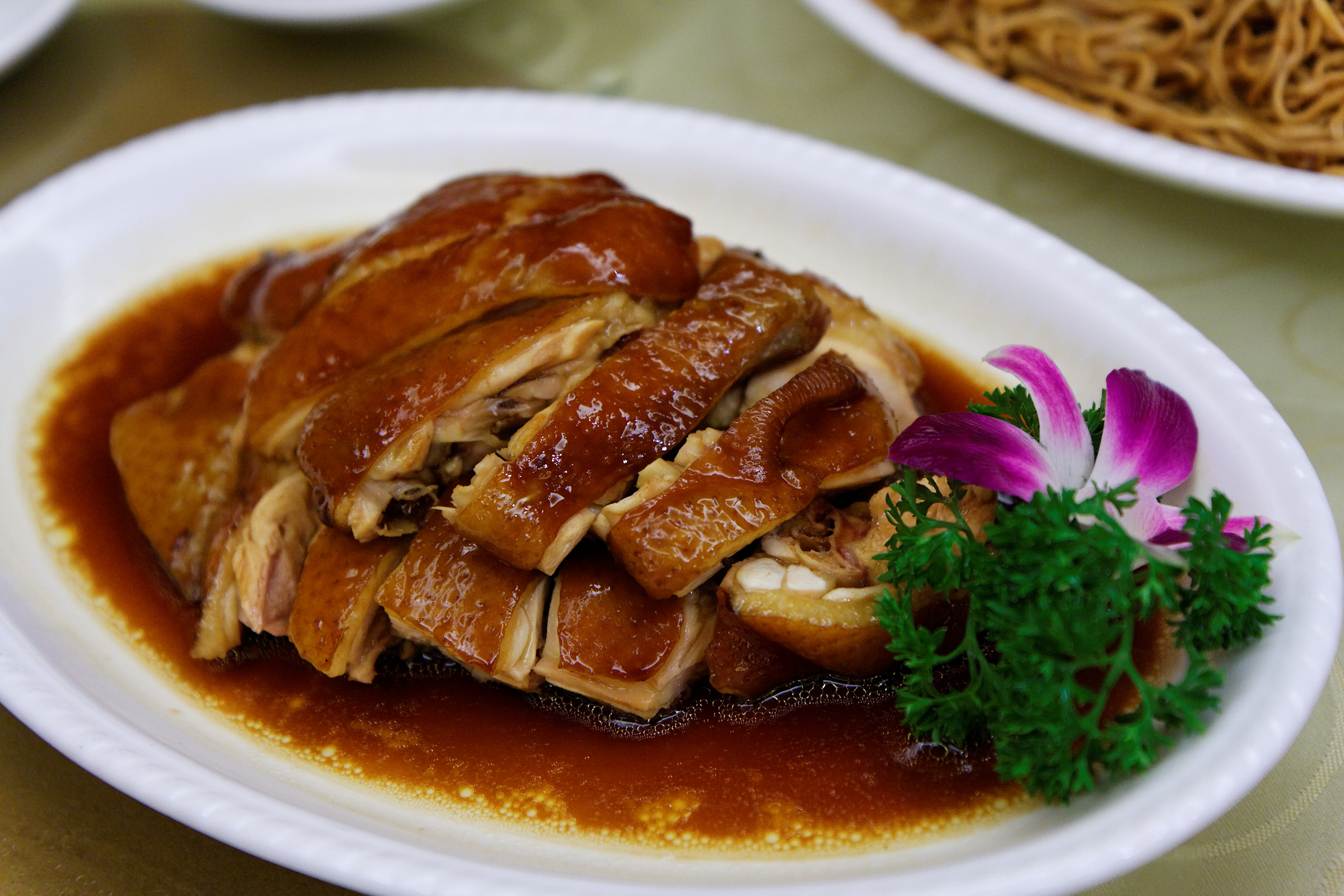
Soy sauce chicken

- Agedashi dōfu – Japanese tofu dish
- Dubu kimchi – Korean tofu and stir-fried kimchi dish
- Hiyayakko – Japanese tofu dish
- Kongguksu – Korean noodle dish in soy milk broth
- Mapo doufu – Sichuan cuisine dish
- Soy sauce chicken – Traditional Cantonese dish
- Sukiyaki – Japanese hot pot dish
- Sundubu jjigae – Korean traditional soft tofu stew
- Tahu goreng – Southeast Asian fried tofu dish
- Teriyaki – Japanese marinade
- Yong Tau Foo – Tofu filled with ground meat or fish
- Zunda – Japanese regional cuisine

=== Product brands ===
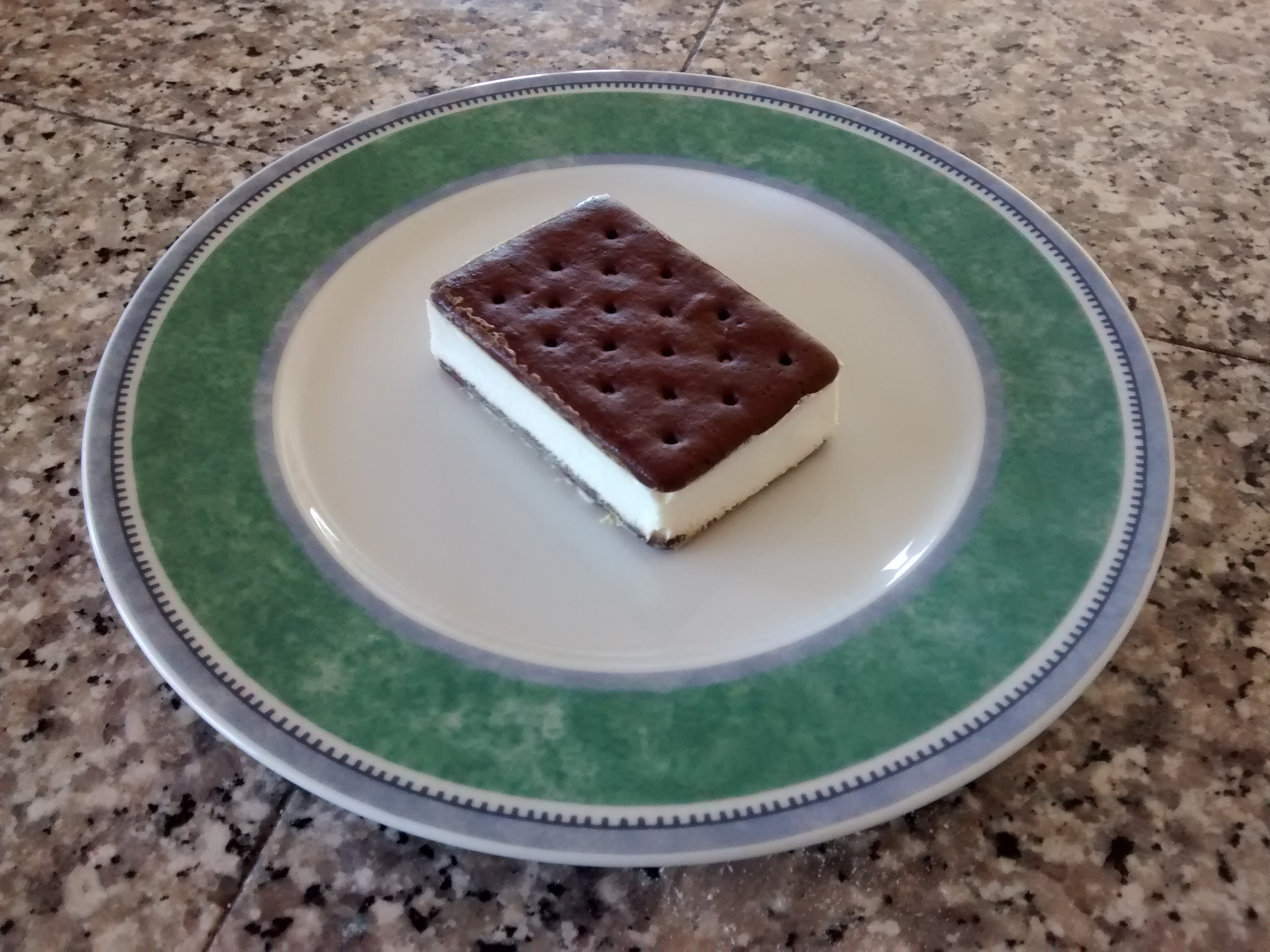
An ice cream sandwich made by Tofutti

- 8th Continent – Brand of soy milk – a brand of soy milk
- Alpro – Food company
- Beanfeast – Vegetarian processed food
- Boca Burger – Veggie burger produced by Kraft Heinz
- Eden Foods Inc. – American organic food company
- Gardein – Line of foods by Conagra Brands
- Kikkoman – Japanese food manufacturer
- La Loma Foods – US vegetarian food brand
- Lightlife – American company producing vegetarian and vegan meat substitutes
- Little Soya – Type of container
- Plamil Foods – British manufacturer of vegan foods
- Silk (soy milk) – American brand of dairy substitute products
- So Good (soy beverage) – Business enterprise owned by the Seventh-day Adventist Church
- Tofurky – American vegan turkey replacement
- Tofutti – American food company
- Vitasoy – Hong Kong beverage company
- Yeo Hiap Seng – Singaporean beverage company

== See also ==
- List of fermented soy products
- List of legume dishes
- List of meat substitutes
- List of tofu dishes
- Lists of prepared foods
- List of vegetable dishes
- Soy milk maker
