= Zundamon =

- Tohoku Zunko Project→Tohoku Zunko & Zundamon Project character
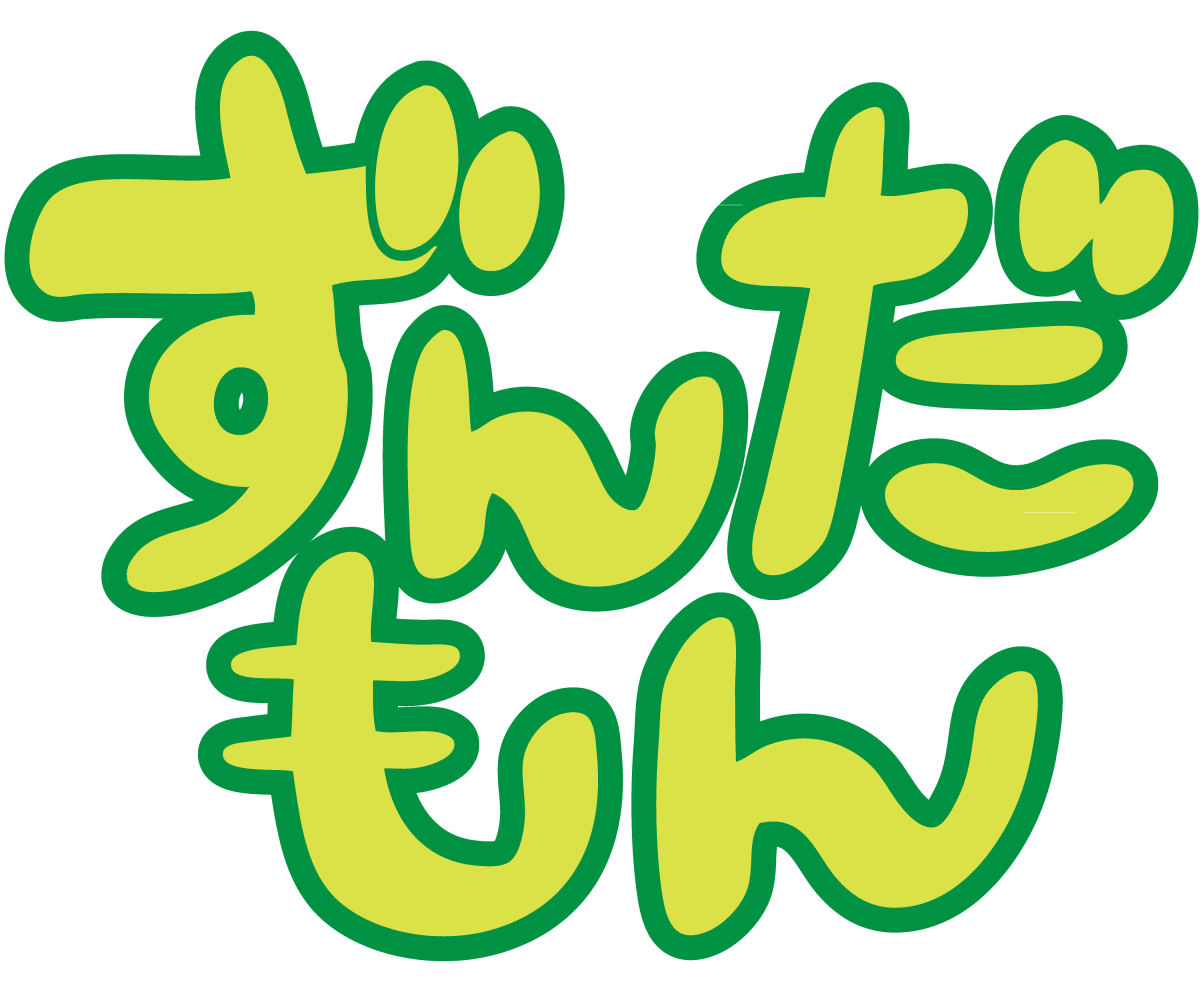
- Official logo

In-universe information
- Species: Fairy of zunda
- Gender: Female (official media); Various (derivative works)
- Specialty: Transformation into a zunda arrow

Zundamon is a mascot character representing the Tohoku region of Japan based on zunda-mochi, a confectionery and regional specialty. The character was created by SSS LLC and designed by Niniko Edomura, and was developed as a related character to Tohoku Zunko. In August 2021, alongside the release of the speech synthesis software Voicevox, Zundamon's voice data (based on the voice of Yuina Ito) was made available to the public. This led to a surge in popularity and recognition, with numerous user-generated videos created on video sharing sites. Around 2023, the Tohoku Zunko Project itself was renamed the Tohoku Zunko & Zundamon Project (abbreviated as the ZunZun Project).

== Description ==
Zundamon is a "zunda fairy" capable of transforming into Tohoku Zunko's "zunda arrow" bow, and (in fan media) can also transform into human form. Eating zunda-mochi is said to increase her intelligence. She often finds herself in unfortunate situations. Her first-person pronoun is "boku". While she is officially designated as a girl, user-generated works have reimagined her as other genders.

Zundamon's hobbies include wandering around aimlessly and making herself appear larger than life. Her birthday is December 5th. She speaks with the suffix "~(na) no da" at the end of her sentences. The "mon" in her name is short for "monster".

In early novels, she was said to exist only in legend, even among the Mochi Mon. Other details in official works vary across different titles, intentionally allowing greater freedom for derivative works.

== History ==
=== 2010s ===
Zundamon was conceived by Yasuo Oda, Shoji Murahama, and Masamune Sakaki as a "yuru-kyara" aimed at users and municipalities resistant to moe characters, to differentiate it from the moe character Tohoku Zunko. The character design by Niniko Edomura and official novels by Toshio Sato helped establish the character settings and content for the Tohoku Zunko Project, including Zundamon. Since around 2015, similar to Tohoku Zunko, Tohoku Itako, and Tohoku Kiritan, the project has permitted companies registered with headquarters in the Tohoku region to use the characters commercially free of charge and without application. In 2017, the anime work Zunda Horizon from the Tohoku Zunko Project, along with the simultaneously released UTAU voice library for singing synthesis software, featured Yuna Ito's voice for the character. From this time onward, Ito expressed her desire to develop voice synthesis software for reading aloud using her own voice.

=== 2020s ===
By the 2020s, a strategy emerged to utilize Zundamon's voice when verifying cutting-edge technologies such as speech synthesis. First, on June 17, 2021, the ITA Corpus Multi-modal Database was released based on funds raised through prior crowdfunding. In addition, Zundamon received an official humanoid design, as well as a voice library for VOICEVOX; this led to a surge of popularity for the character online, with several songs using their voicebanks being released.

In August 2026, it was announced that the ZunZun Project would be doing a collaboration with Phantasy Star Online 2: New Genesis, with a lineup of Zundamon-themed cosmetics including avatar items, chat stickers and a weapon skin modeled after Zundamon's "Zunda Arrow" form. The collaboration began on the 2nd of September, 2026.
