= Mamenori =

Thin wrappers of soybean paper used as a substitute for nori

Mamenori (まめのり), or soybean paper, also referred to as mame-nori-san (まめのりさん), are thin wrappers used as a substitute for nori in sushi. They are usually made from soybeans, starch such as soy flour, and water, and are frequently colored green, pink, yellow, or other fluorescent shades with turmeric, paprika, spinach, or artificial coloring.

Compared to seaweed-based nori, mamenori are softer, with a similar texture to rice paper wrappers, and have a more mild flavor and neutral scent. Mamenori are also used as spring roll wrappers or as dessert wraps.

== See also ==
- List of soy-based foods
