= Nori =

Edible seaweed species of the red algae genus Pyropia

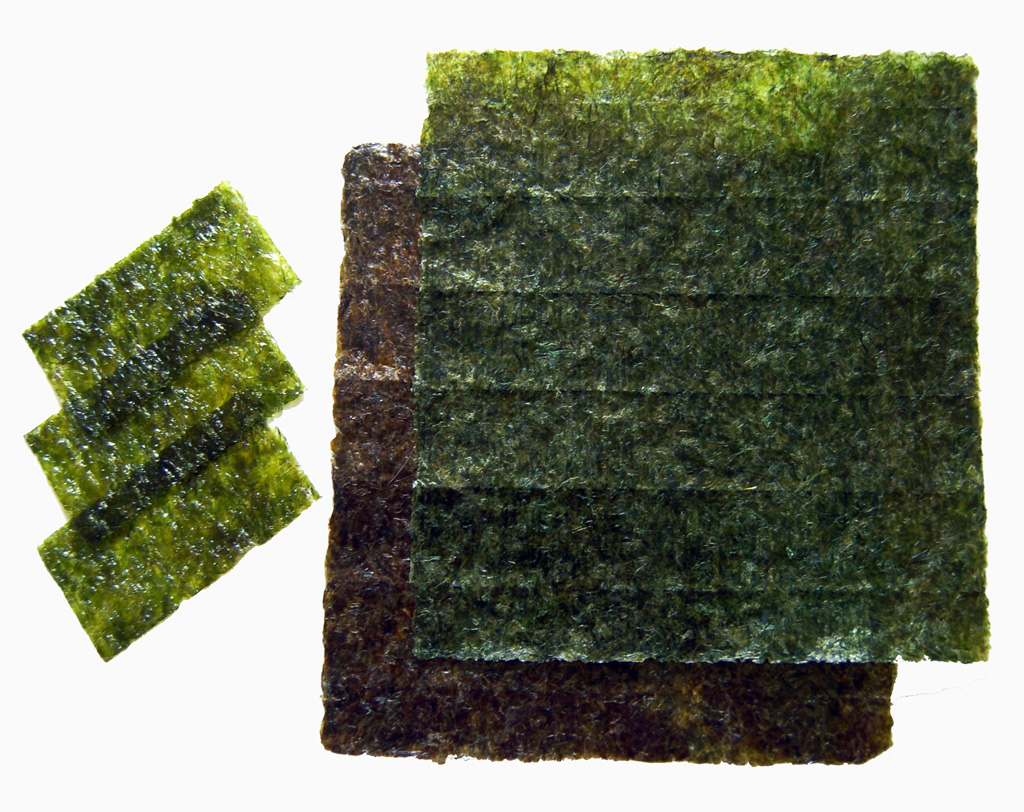
- Nori sheets
- Alternative names: Seaweed
- Type: Edible seaweed
- Place of origin: Japan
- Associated cuisine: Japanese cuisine
- Main ingredients: Dried red algae
- Similar dishes: Gim, Kombu, Laverbread, Gamet

Nori (Japanese: 海苔) is a dried edible seaweed used in Japanese cuisine, usually made from species of the red algae genus Pyropia, including P. yezoensis and P. tenera. It has a strong and distinctive flavor, and is generally made into flat sheets and used to wrap rolls of sushi or onigiri (rice balls).

The finished dried sheets are made by a shredding and rack-drying process that resembles papermaking. They are sold in packs in grocery stores for culinary purposes. Since nori sheets easily absorb water from the air and degrade, a desiccant is needed when storing nori for any significant time.

Nori—despite not being cultivated by humans until the 1600s—has been popular since the pre-modern era in Japan, having been used as currency, offerings at shrines, and food since the 700s.

== History ==
=== Ancient ===
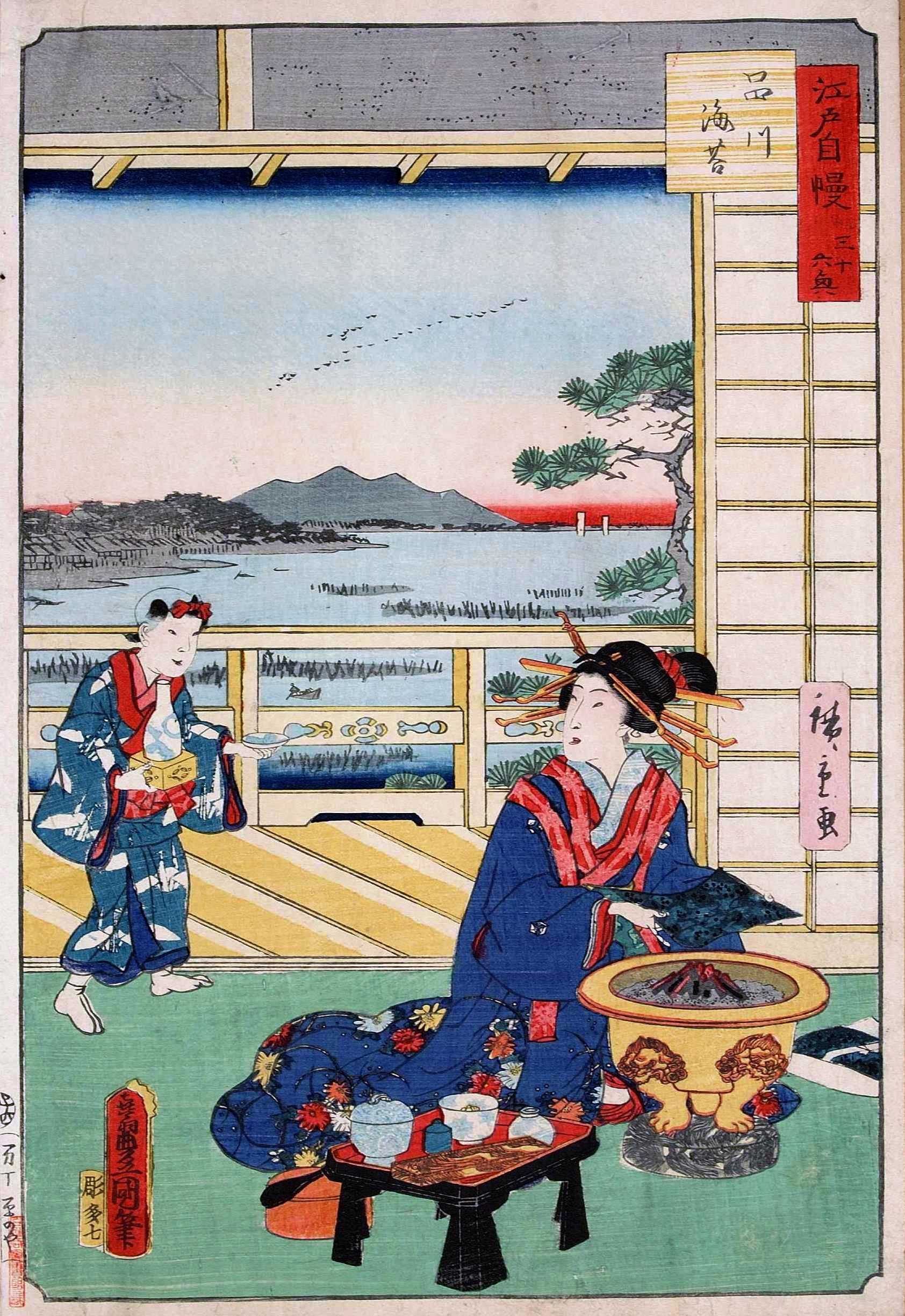
Toasting nori sheets in Shinagawa, print by Hiroshige, 1864

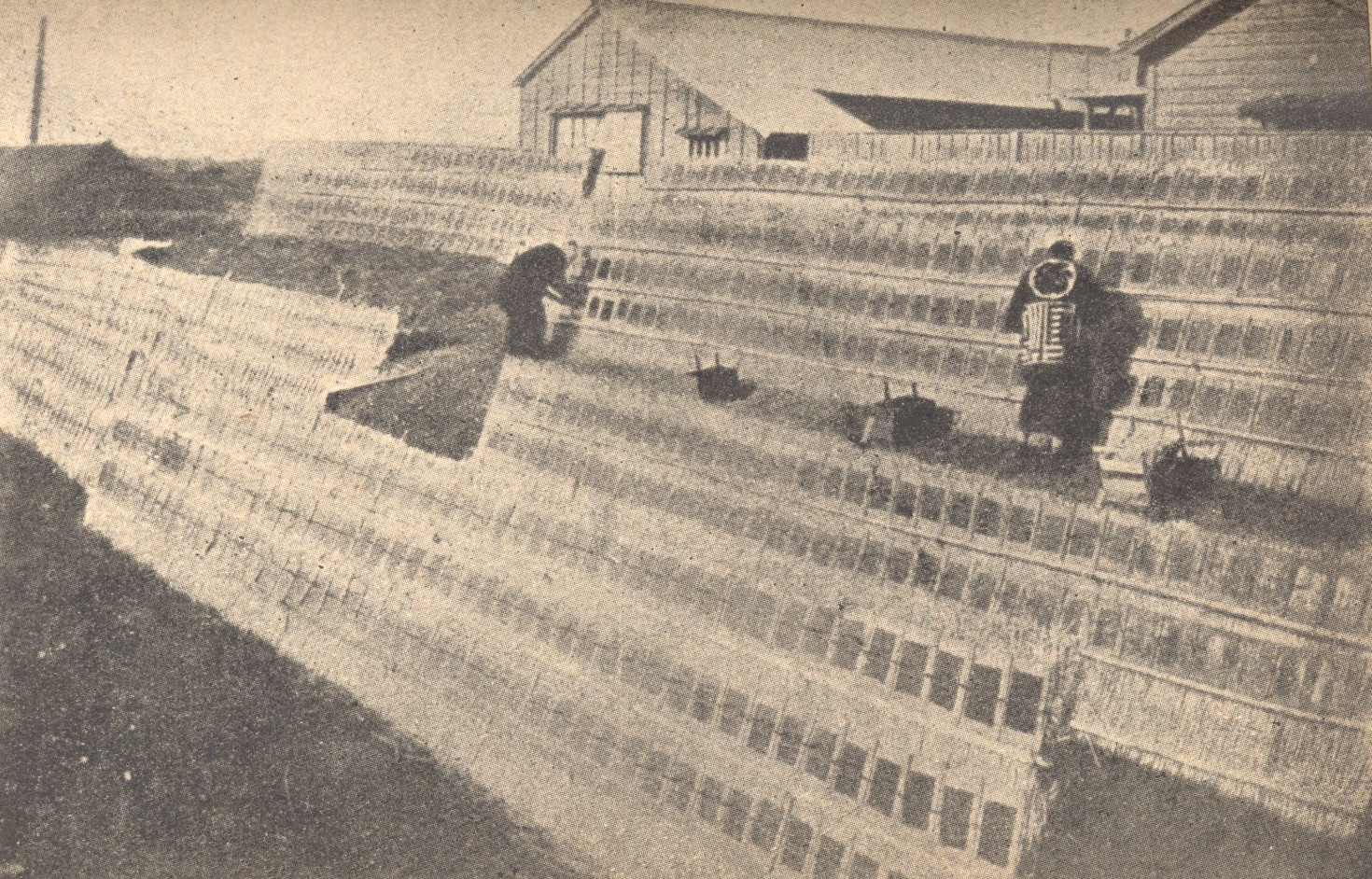
Nori being dried on racks, 1921

Originally, the term nori was generic and referred to seaweeds, including hijiki. One of the earliest descriptions of nori is dated to around the eighth century. In the Taihō Code of 701 CE, nori was already included in the form of taxation. Local people were described as drying nori in the Hitachi Province Fudoki (721–721 CE), and harvesting of nori was mentioned in the Izumo Province Fudoki (713–733 CE). In the Utsubo Monogatari, written around 987 CE, nori was recognized as a common food.

=== Modern ===
Nori had been consumed as paste form until the sheet form (ita-nori 板海苔) was invented in Asakusa, Tokyo, around 1750 in the Edo period through the method of Japanese paper-making.

The word "nori" first appeared in an English-language publication in C. P. Thunberg's Trav., published in 1796. It was used in conjugation as "Awa nori", probably referring to what now is called "aonori", i.e., green laver.

When Japan was in need of high food production after World War II, production of nori was in decline. They sought to cultivate nori in addition to traditional wild harvesting from the sea. Due to a lack of understanding of nori's three-stage life cycle, however, those attempting to produce nori artificially did not understand why their cultivation methods were not being productive with nori. The industry was rescued by knowledge derived from the work of British phycologist Kathleen Mary Drew-Baker, who had been researching the seaweed Porphyra umbilicalis that grew in the seas around Wales and was harvested for food (laverbread). Her work was discovered by Japanese scientists who applied it to artificial methods of seeding and growing the nori, rescuing the industry. Kathleen Baker was hailed in Japan as the "Mother of the Sea" and a statue was erected in her memory. She is still revered as the savior of the Japanese nori industry.

The word nori started to be used widely in the United States and the product (imported in dry form from Japan) became widely available at natural food stores and Asian-American grocery stores in the 1960s due to the macrobiotic movement and in the 1970s with the increase of sushi bars and Japanese restaurants.

In the 21st century, the Japanese nori industry faces a new decline due to increased competition from seaweed producers in China and Korea, and an increase in domestic sales tax.

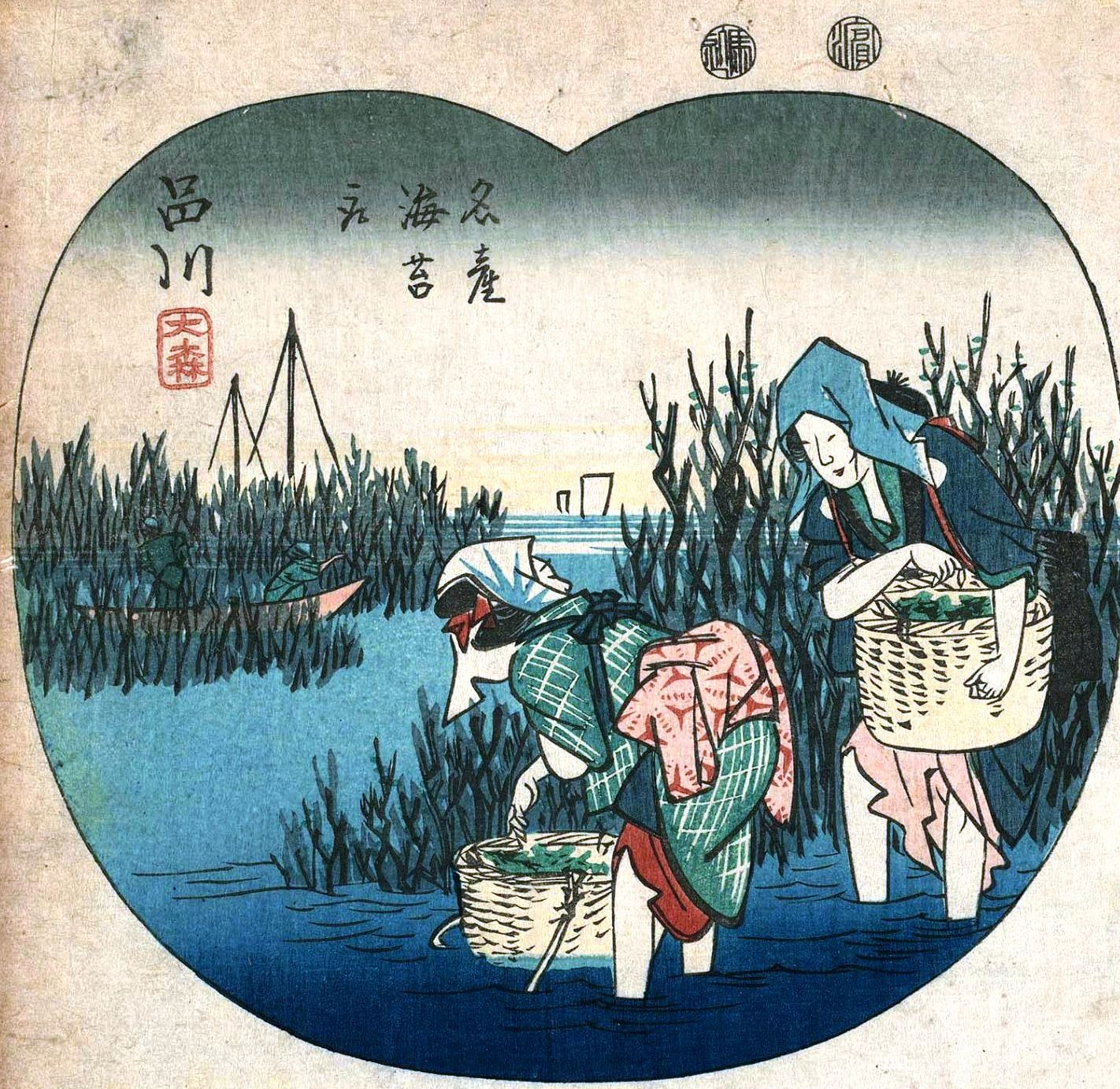
Women gathering nori, print by Hiroshige, 1849

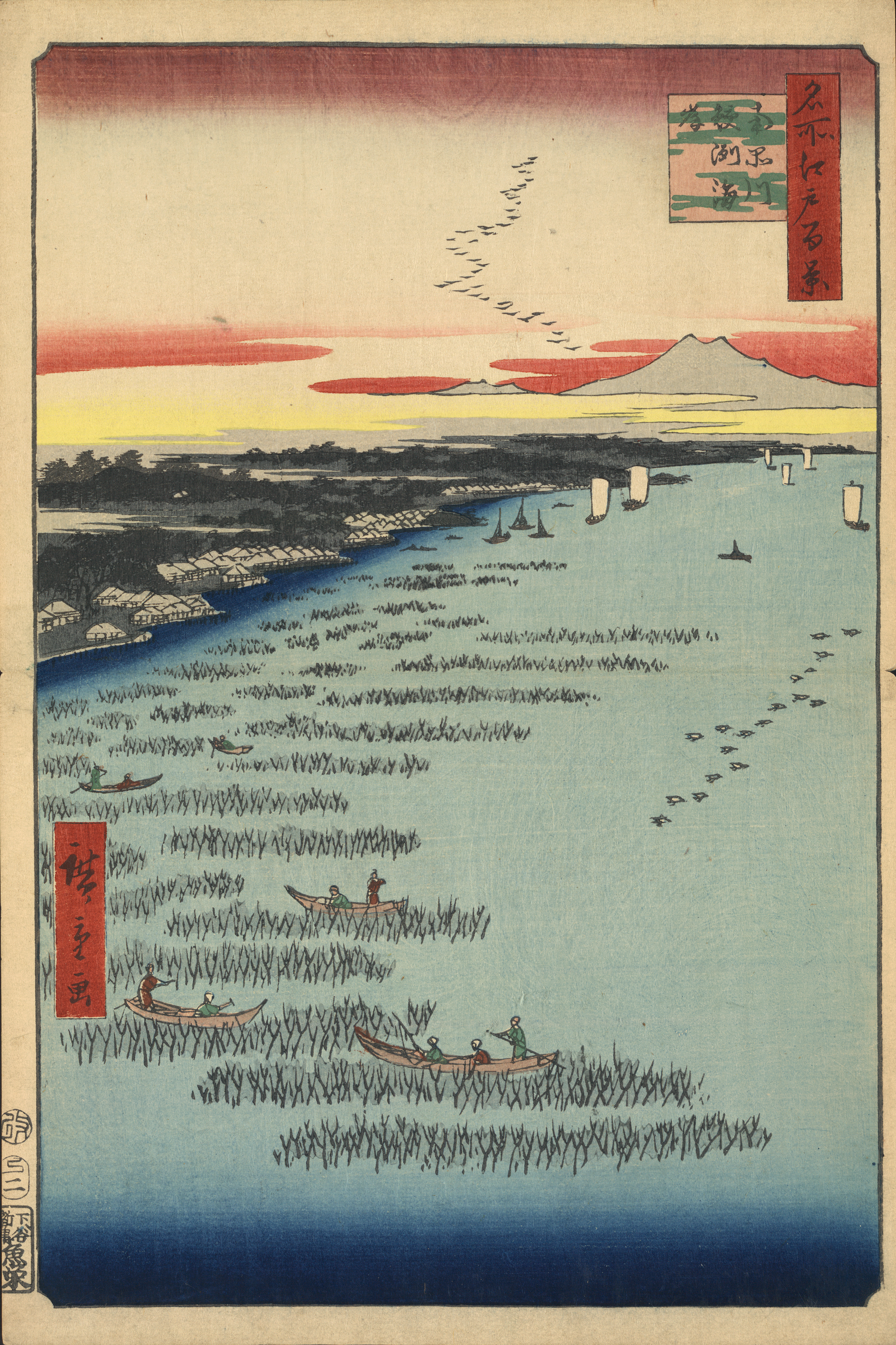
Nori farm in Shinagawa, by Hiroshige, 1857

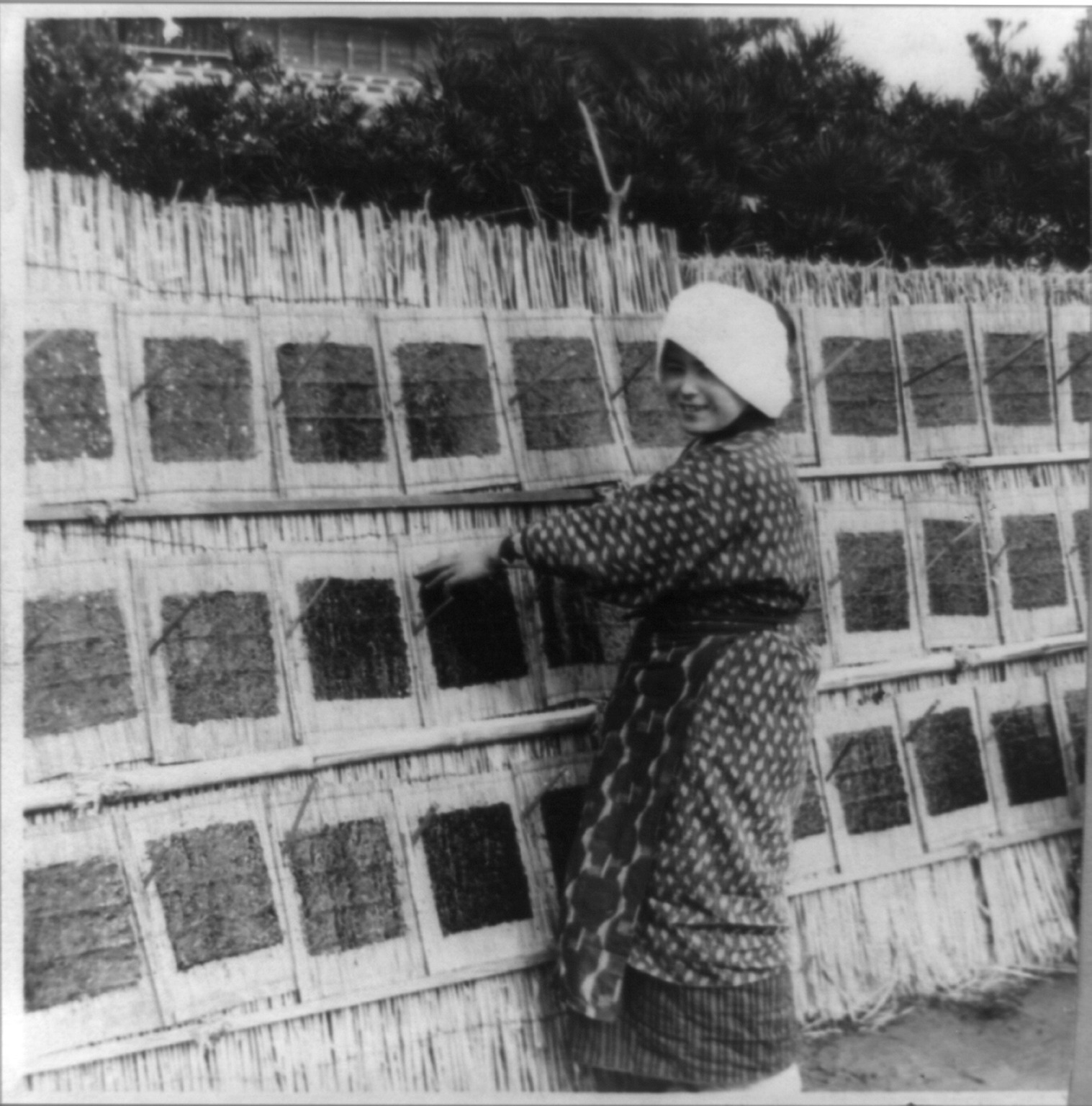
A woman drying nori, 1890–1923

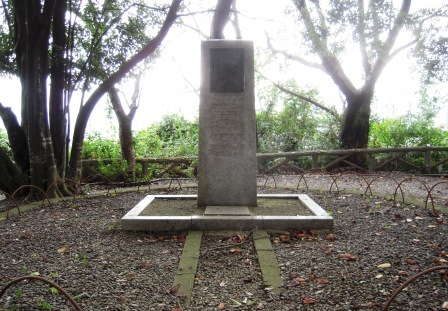
Monument to Kathleen Mary Drew-Baker in Uto, Kumamoto. Her research revived nori production in Japan.

== Production ==
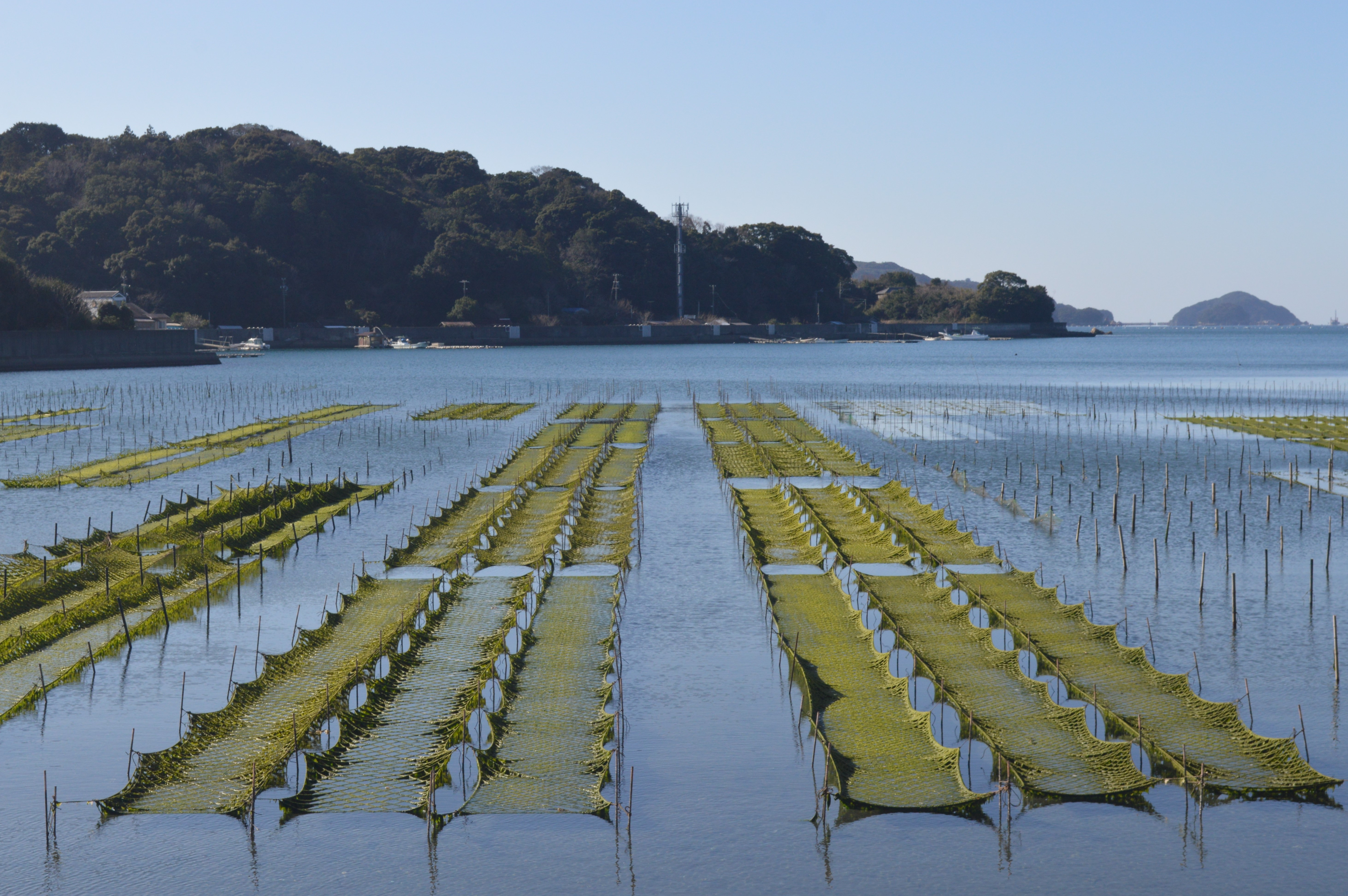
Nori farm in Gokasho Bay, Mie Prefecture

Production and processing of nori is an advanced form of agriculture. The biology of Pyropia, although complicated, now is well understood, and this knowledge is used to control the production process. Farming takes place in the sea where the Pyropia plants grow attached to nets suspended at the sea surface and where the farmers operate from boats. The plants grow rapidly, requiring approximately 45 days from "seeding" until the first harvest. Multiple harvests can be taken from a single seeding, typically at approximately ten-day intervals. Harvesting is accomplished using mechanical harvesters of a variety of configurations. Processing of raw product is mostly accomplished by highly automated machines that accurately duplicate traditional manual processing steps, but with much improved efficiency and consistency. The final product is a paper-thin, black, dried sheet of approximately 18 cm × 20 cm (7 in × 8 in) and 3 grams (0.11 oz) in weight.

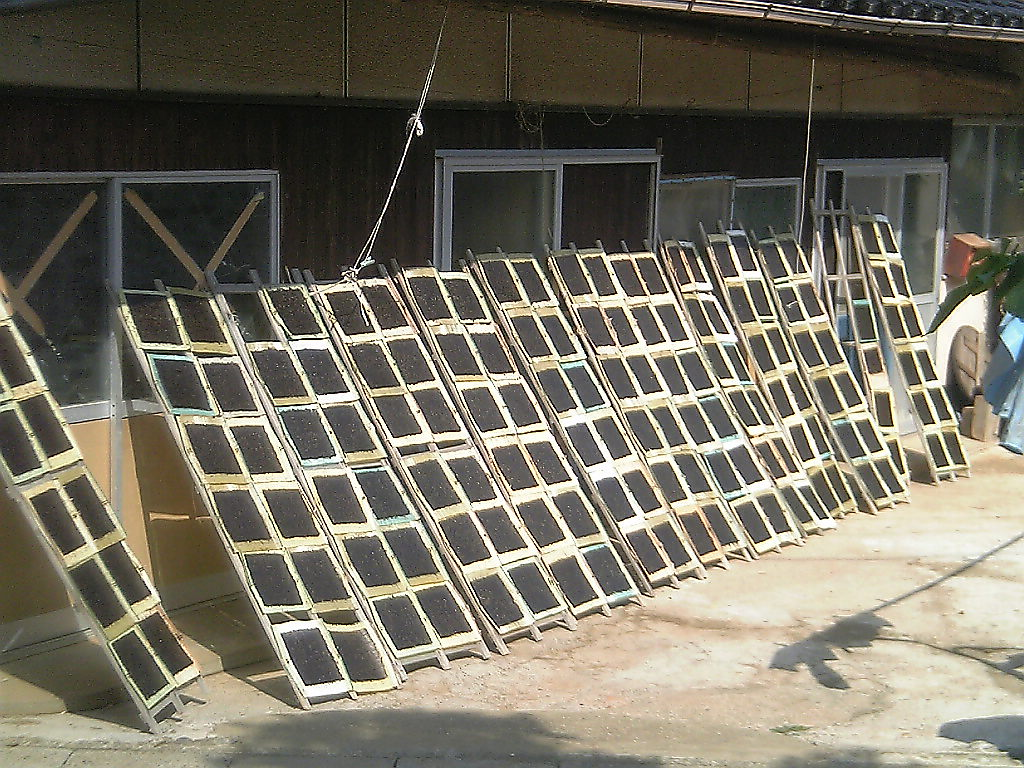
Nori drying on Mishima Island

Several grades of nori are available in the United States. The most common (and least expensive) grades are imported from China, costing approximately six cents per sheet. At the high end, ranging up to 90 cents per sheet, are "delicate shin-nori" (nori from the first of the year's several harvests) cultivated in the Ariake Sea, off the island of Kyushu in Japan.

In Japan, more than 600 square kilometres (230 mi^{2}) of coastal waters are given to producing 350,000 tonnes (340,000 long tons) of nori, worth more than a billion dollars. China produces approximately a third of this amount.

Wild seaweed is still gathered to make nori, often found growing on rocks at the beach. Such wild nori is called iwanori ("rock nori"), and are known for their rougher texture and taste.

== Culinary uses ==
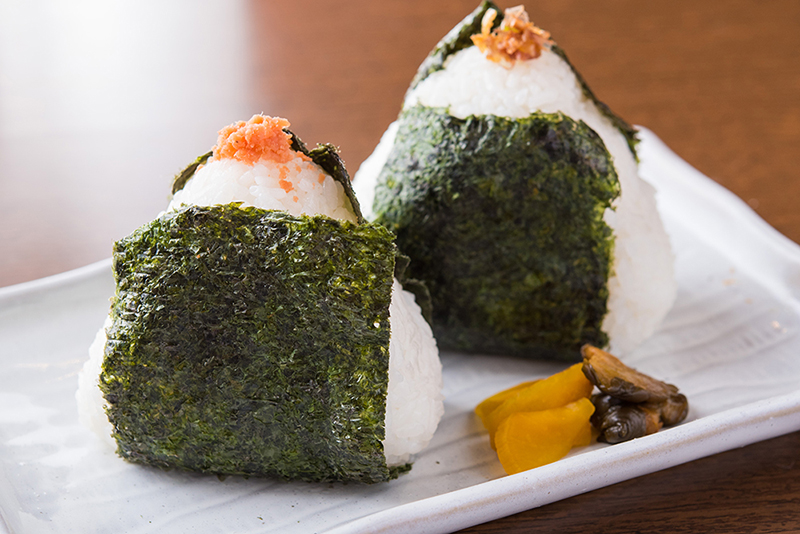
Nori used to wrap onigiri

Nori is commonly used as a wrap for sushi and onigiri (rice balls). The dry seaweed is used to pick up rice balls without getting the hands sticky. Senbei (rice crackers) sometimes contain a piece of nori as well.

Strips or small sheets of nori are used as garnish for noodles, soups, and rice dishes. Flakes of nori are used in furikake seasonings, to be sprinkled over rice or added to onigiri. Very small flakes or powdered nori can be dusted over a variety of savory foods.

Typically, nori is toasted prior to consumption. Toasted nori is called yaki-nori. A common secondary product is toasted and flavored nori (ajitsuke-nori), in which a flavoring mixture (variable, but typically soy sauce, sugar, sake, mirin, and seasonings) is applied in combination with the toasting process. Nori is also eaten by making it into a soy sauce-flavored paste, nori no tsukudani (海苔の佃煮). Sometimes it is also used as a form of food decoration, such as creating faces or anime characters in bento boxes.

A related product, prepared from the unrelated green algae Monostroma and Enteromorpha, is called aonori (青海苔 literally blue/green nori) and it is used as an herb on everyday meals, such as okonomiyaki and yakisoba.

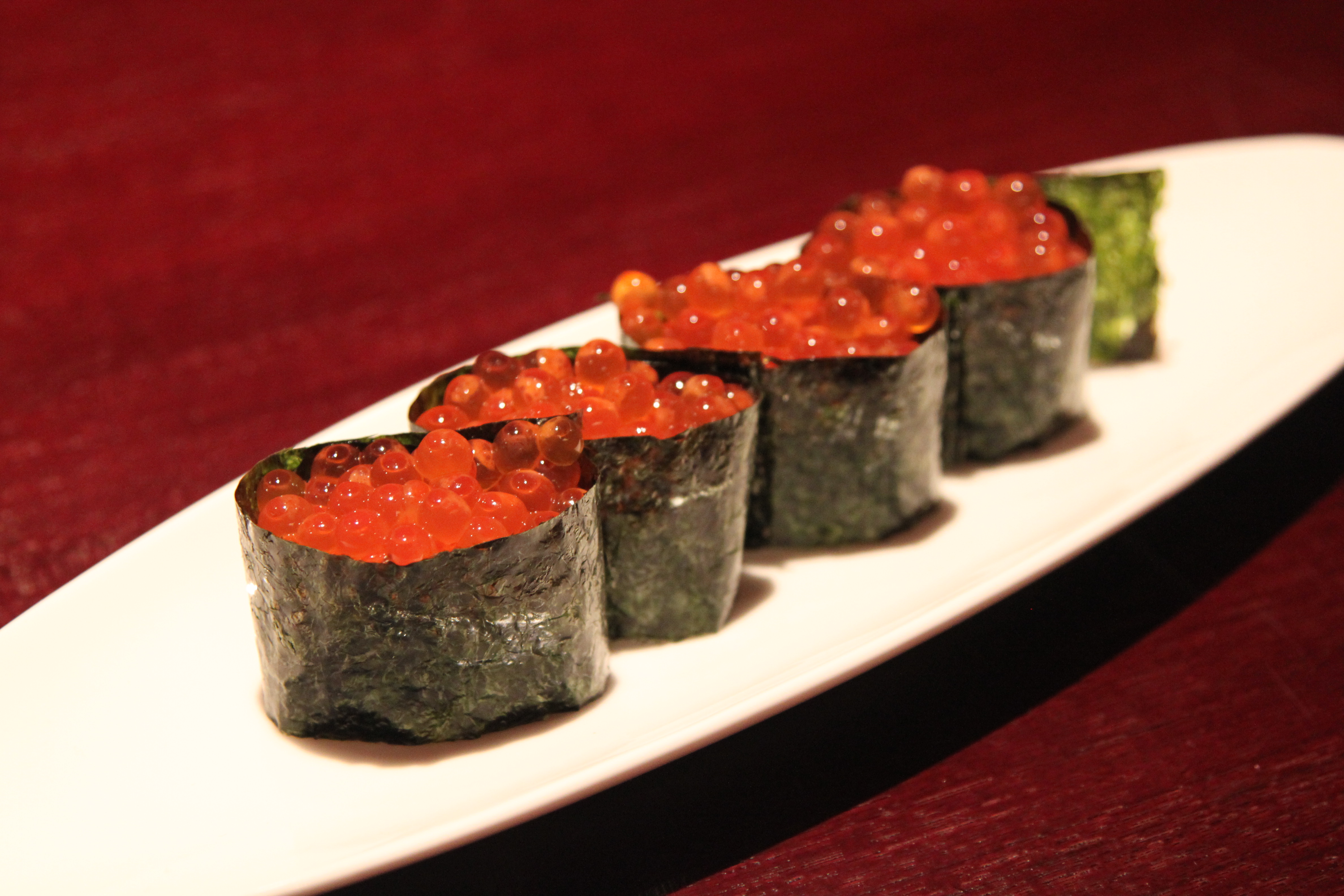
Nori used to wrap sushi with ikura (salmon eggs)

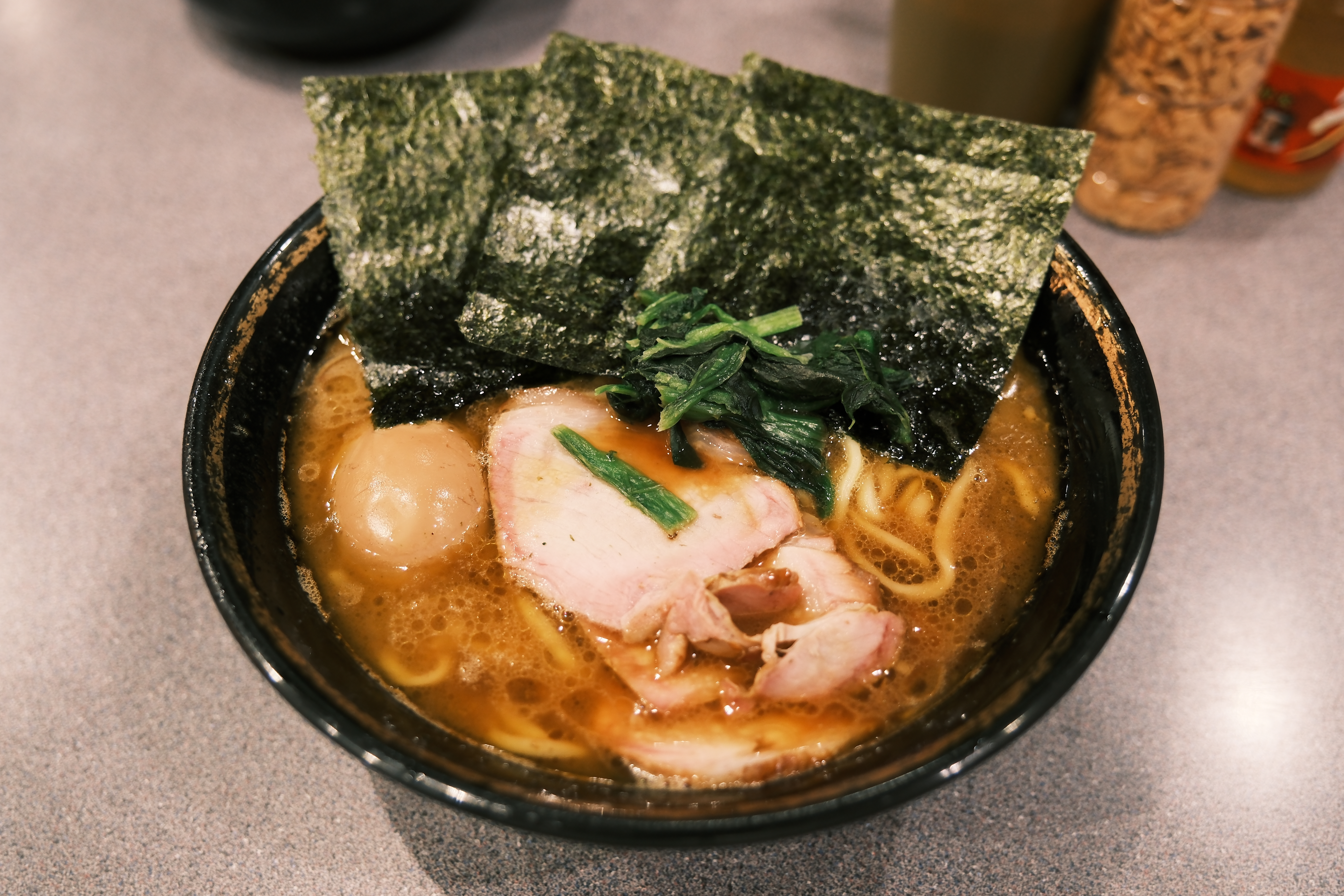
Bowl of ramen with nori sheets

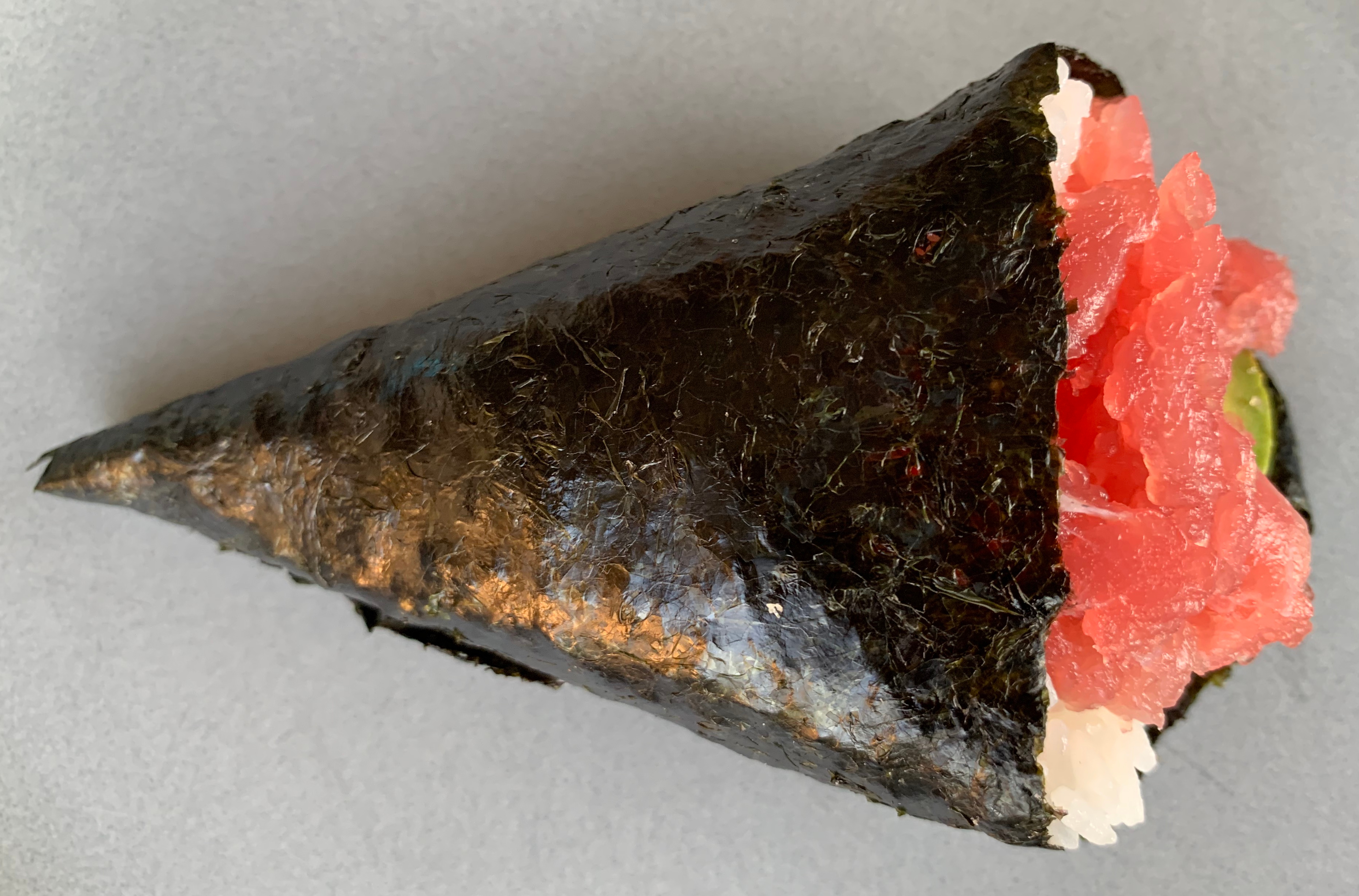
Temaki is always wrapped with nori for easy holding

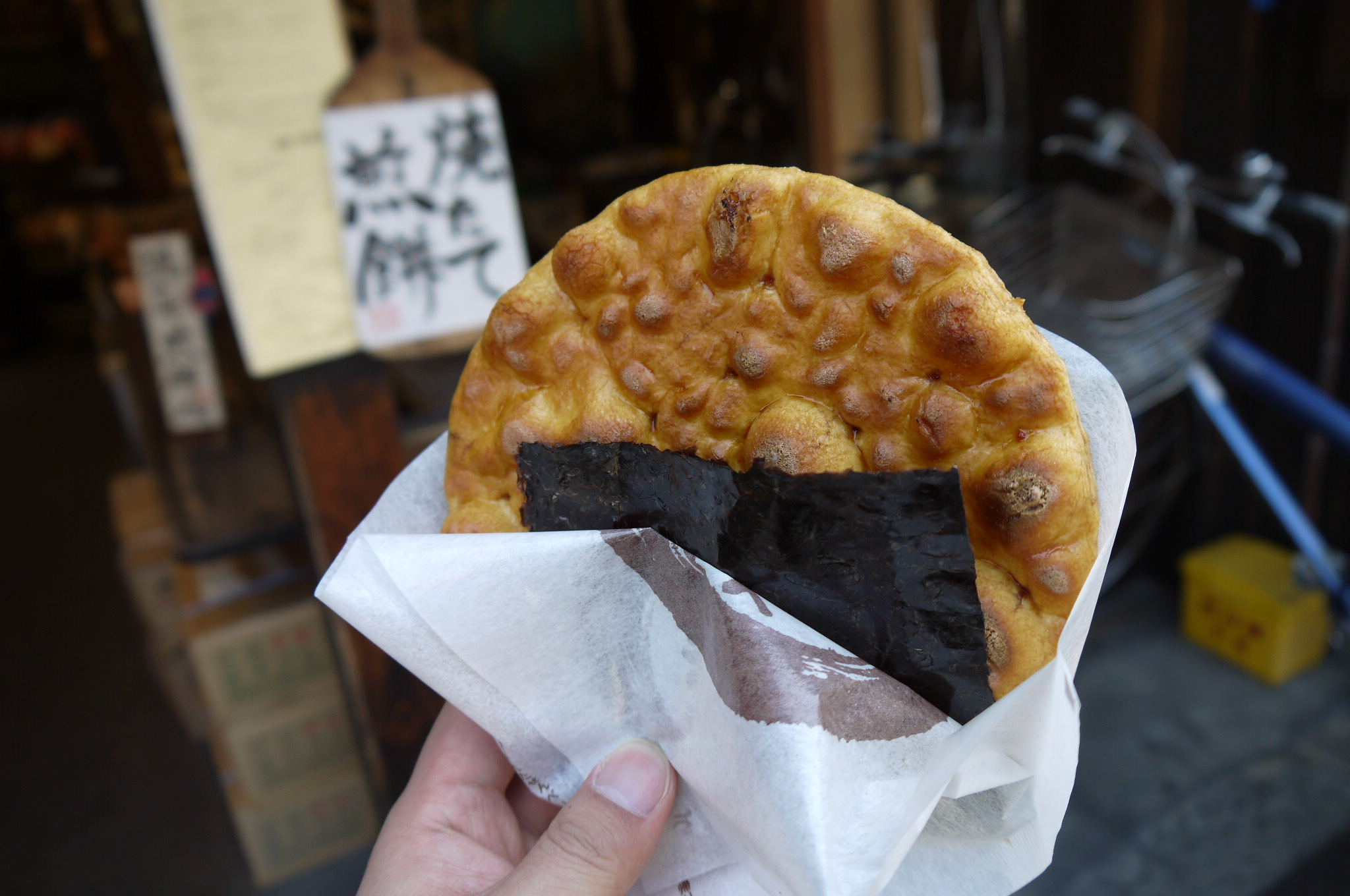
Senbei cracker wrapped with nori

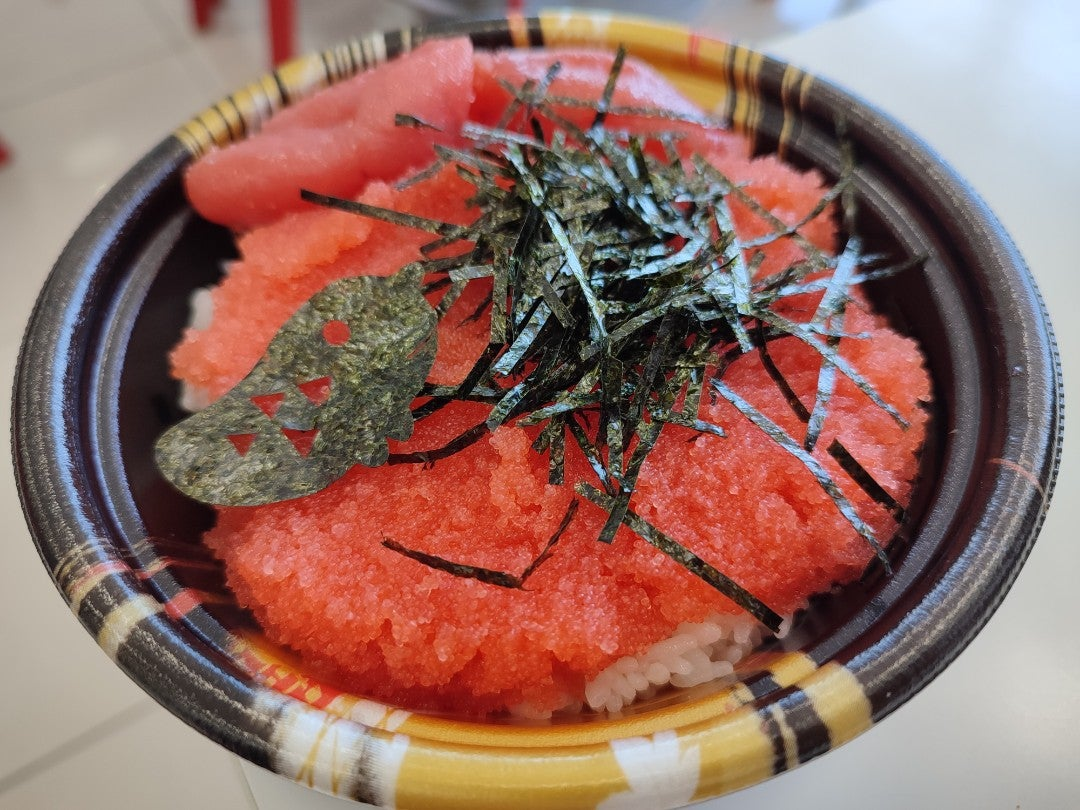
Rice bowl topped with mentaiko and nori

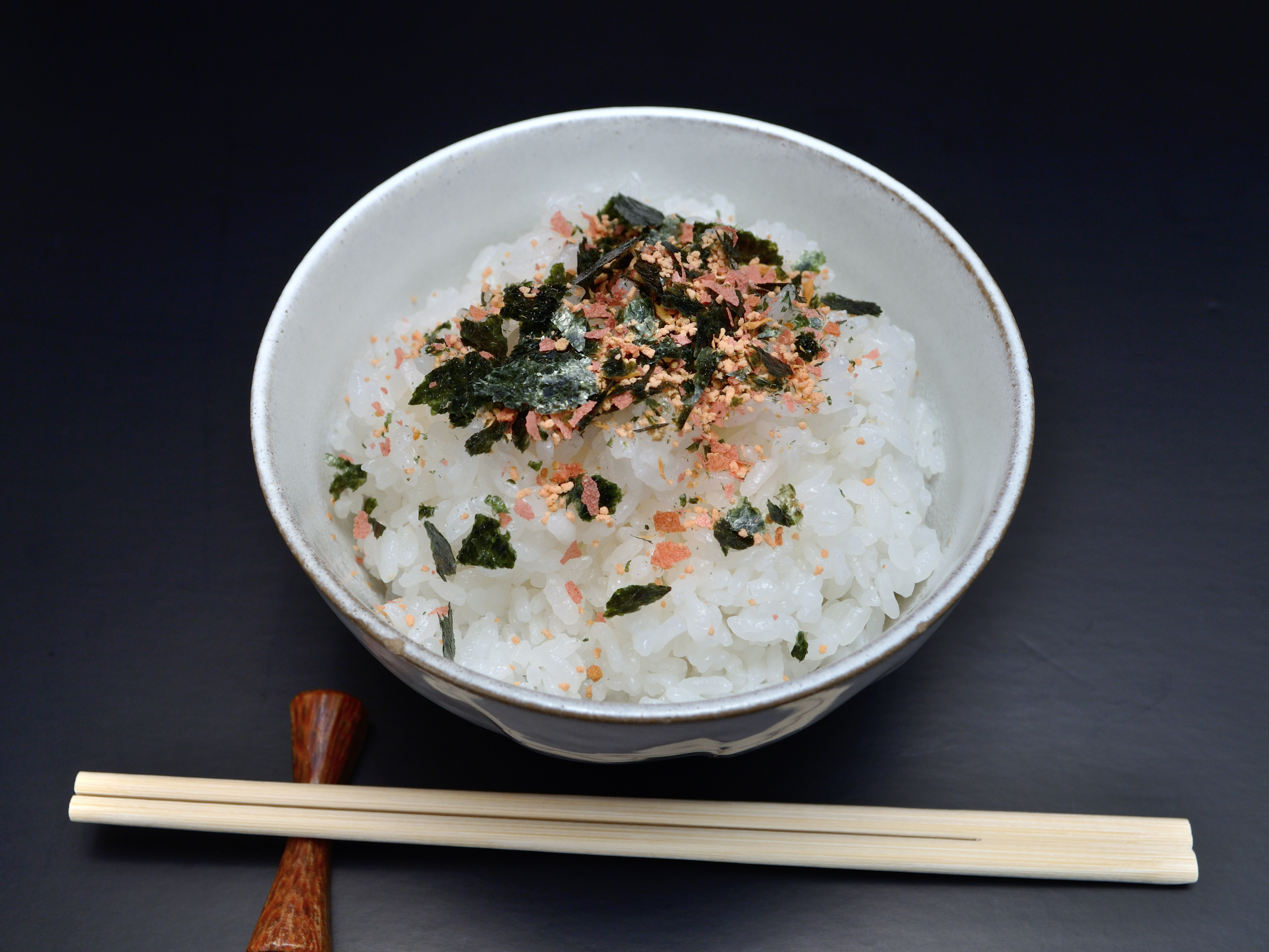
Rice with furikake seasoning made of nori flakes

== Nutrition ==
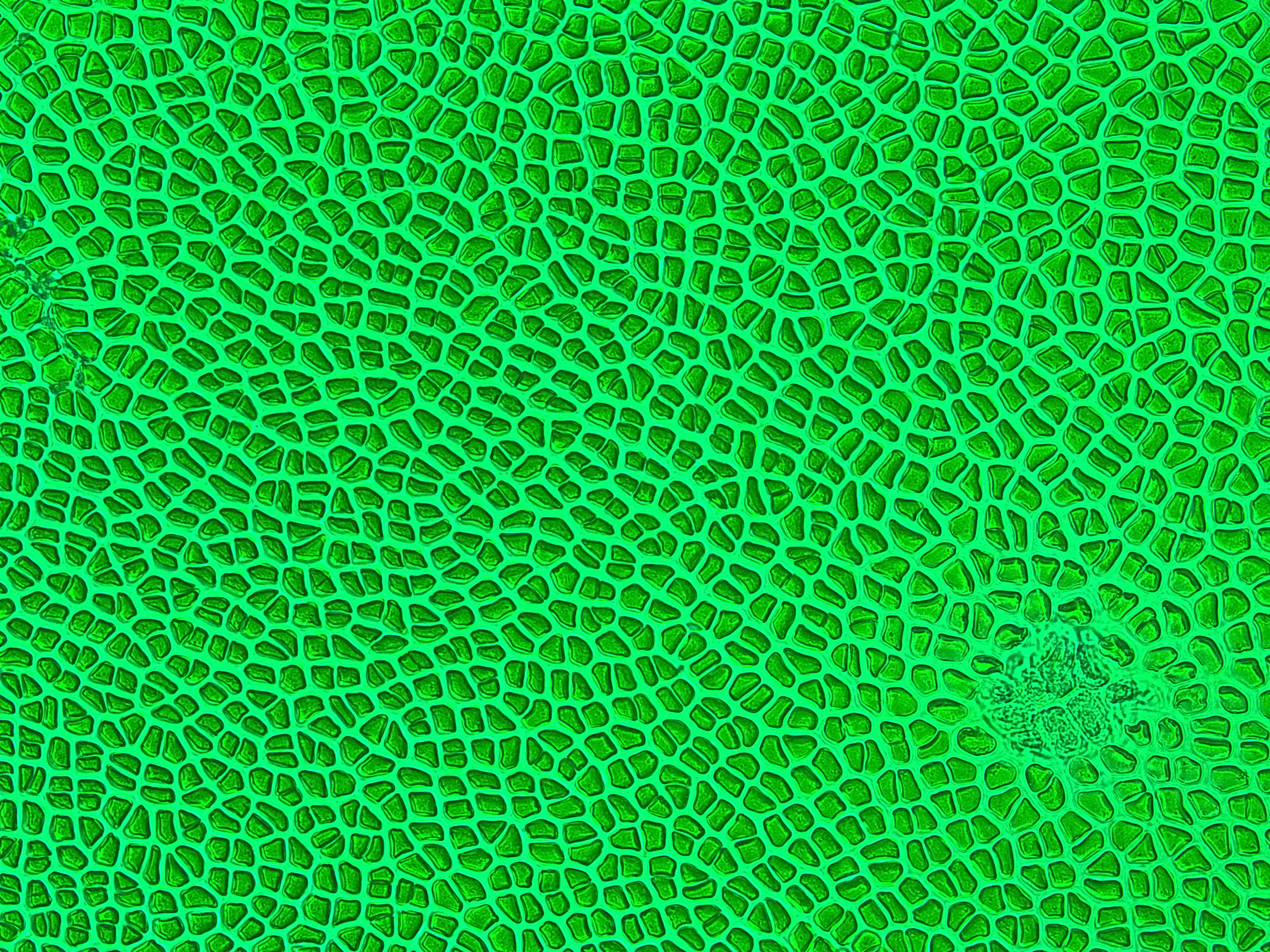
Nori sheet under a microscope, 200 times magnification

Raw seaweed is 85% water, 6% protein, 5% carbohydrates, and has negligible fat. In a 100 gram reference amount, seaweed is a rich source (20% or more of the Daily Value, DV) of vitamin A, vitamin C, riboflavin, and folate. Seaweed is a moderate source (less than 20% DV) of niacin, iron, and zinc. Seaweed has a high content of iodine, providing a substantial amount in just one gram.

Whether nori is an effective plant source of vitamin B12 remains under debate. Vitamin B12 is difficult to find from non-animal sources, so a plant source of B12 would be useful for vegans and vegetarians. A 2014 study reported that dried purple laver ("nori") contains vitamin B12 in sufficient quantities to meet the RDA requirement (Vitamin B12 content: 77.6 μg /100 g dry weight). By contrast, however, a 2017 review concluded that vitamin B12 may be destroyed during metabolism or is converted into inactive B12 analogs during drying and storage. The Academy of Nutrition and Dietetics stated in 2016 that nori is not an adequate source of vitamin B12 for humans. A 2024 study found that vegetarians eating 5 grams of nori per day for a month showed an increase in serum B12 levels. This suggests that at least some of the B12 in nori is bioavailable and usable by the human body.

== Health risks ==
Nori may contain toxic metals (arsenic and cadmium), depending upon the harvested seaweed's habitat and ecology. It also contains amphipod allergens that may cause serious allergic reactions, especially in highly sensitized crustacean-allergic people.

== Similar food ==
The red algae genera is also consumed in Korean cuisine as gim (김), in Chinese cuisine as haitai (海苔) or zicai (紫菜), and in Wales and Ireland as laverbread.

== See also ==
- Laverbread – Food made from edible seaweed
- Gamet – Dried edible seaweed from the Philippines
- Mamenori – Thin wrappers of soybean paper used as a substitute for nori
- Mekong weed – Genus of filamentous green algae, – river algae often eaten in sheets in Laos
- Spam musubi – Spam and rice wrapped with nori
- Porphyra
