= Dougan =

Firm variety of tofu

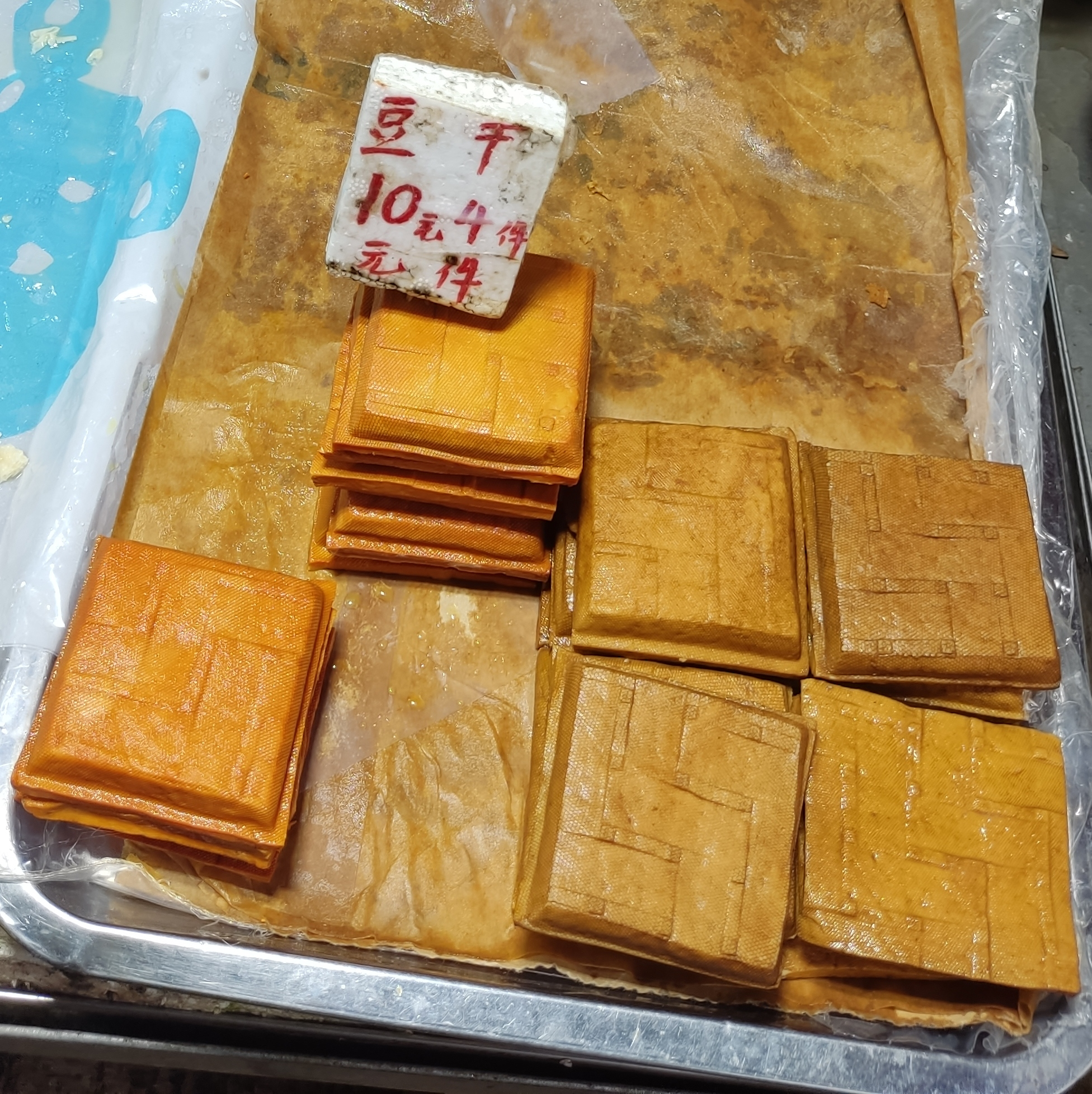
Dougan

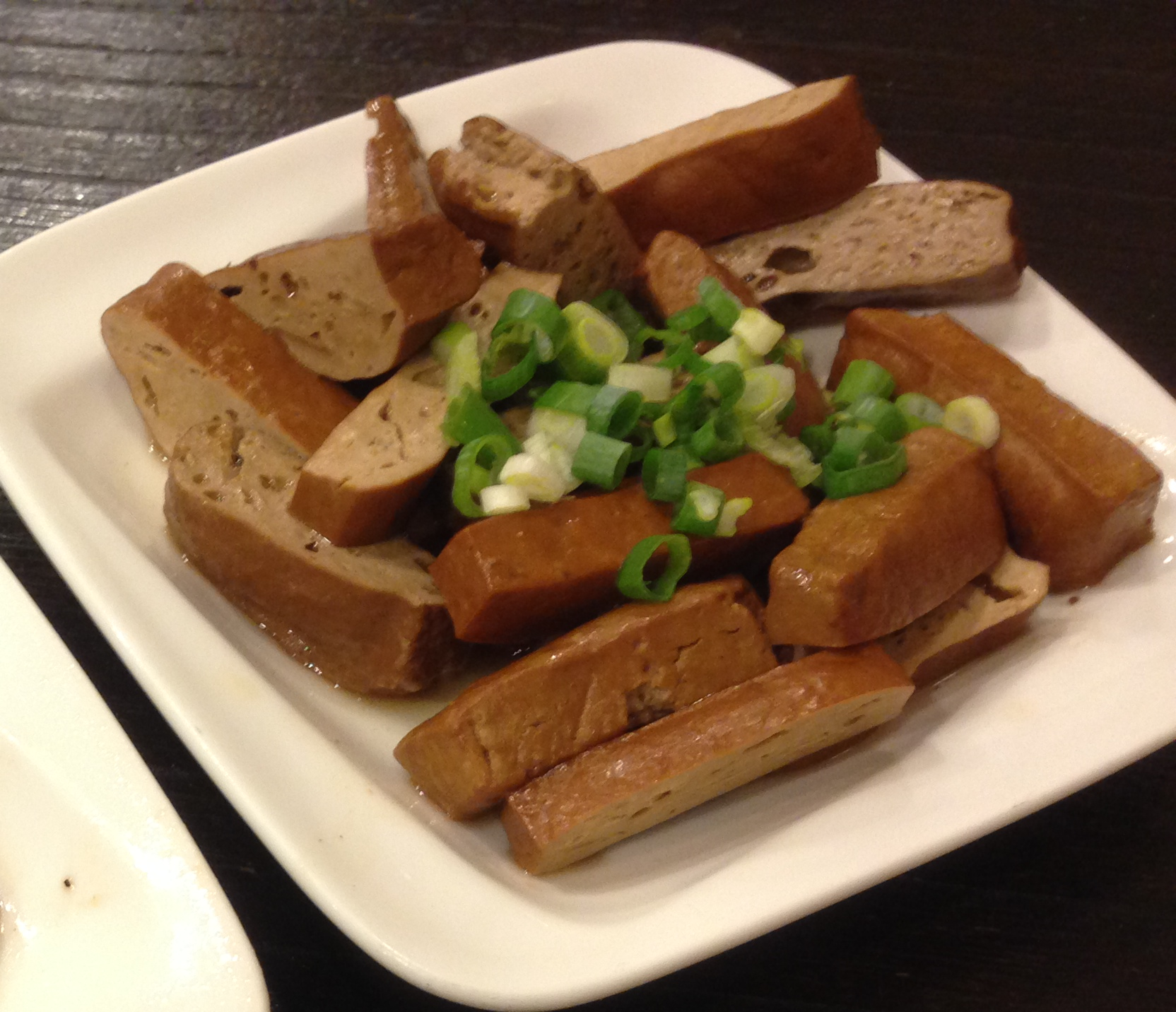
Dougan served at a restaurant in Taipei

Dougan (Chinese: 豆干/豆乾; pinyin: dòugān) is a very firm variety of tofu popular in Chinese cuisine. It differs from regular tofu in that it is firm whereas tofu is soft. It is made from soybeans with added calcium sulfate, and sometimes flavored with salt, soy sauce, and five-spice powder.

== Name ==
This food's name is composed of two syllables, dòu (豆, "bean"), and gān (simplified Chinese: 干; traditional Chinese: 乾; lit. 'dry'). This is different from tofu (which also has two syllables), but the second syllable in tofu is "fu" (腐). The full name is called doufu gan (simplified Chinese: 豆腐干; traditional Chinese: 豆腐乾; lit. 'dried tofu').

== Difference from other tofu ==
Dougan has a lower moisture content than regular tofu in that it is drier and has a greater bean-to-water ratio than tofu. This means that dougan contains more protein per gram, as the proportion of water is less. Dougan is different from firm tofu by being even firmer. It is also different from seitan, which is made from wheat instead of soy.

It is important to distinguish between regular tofu and dougan, as it may not be appropriate to substitute regular tofu for dougan in recipes which call for dougan.

== In popular culture ==
- Dougan is mentioned in Danganronpa: Trigger Happy Havoc as a food Makoto Naegi dislikes.

== See also ==
- List of soy-based foods
