= Soy nut =

Soaked, drained and baked soybeans

Soy nuts
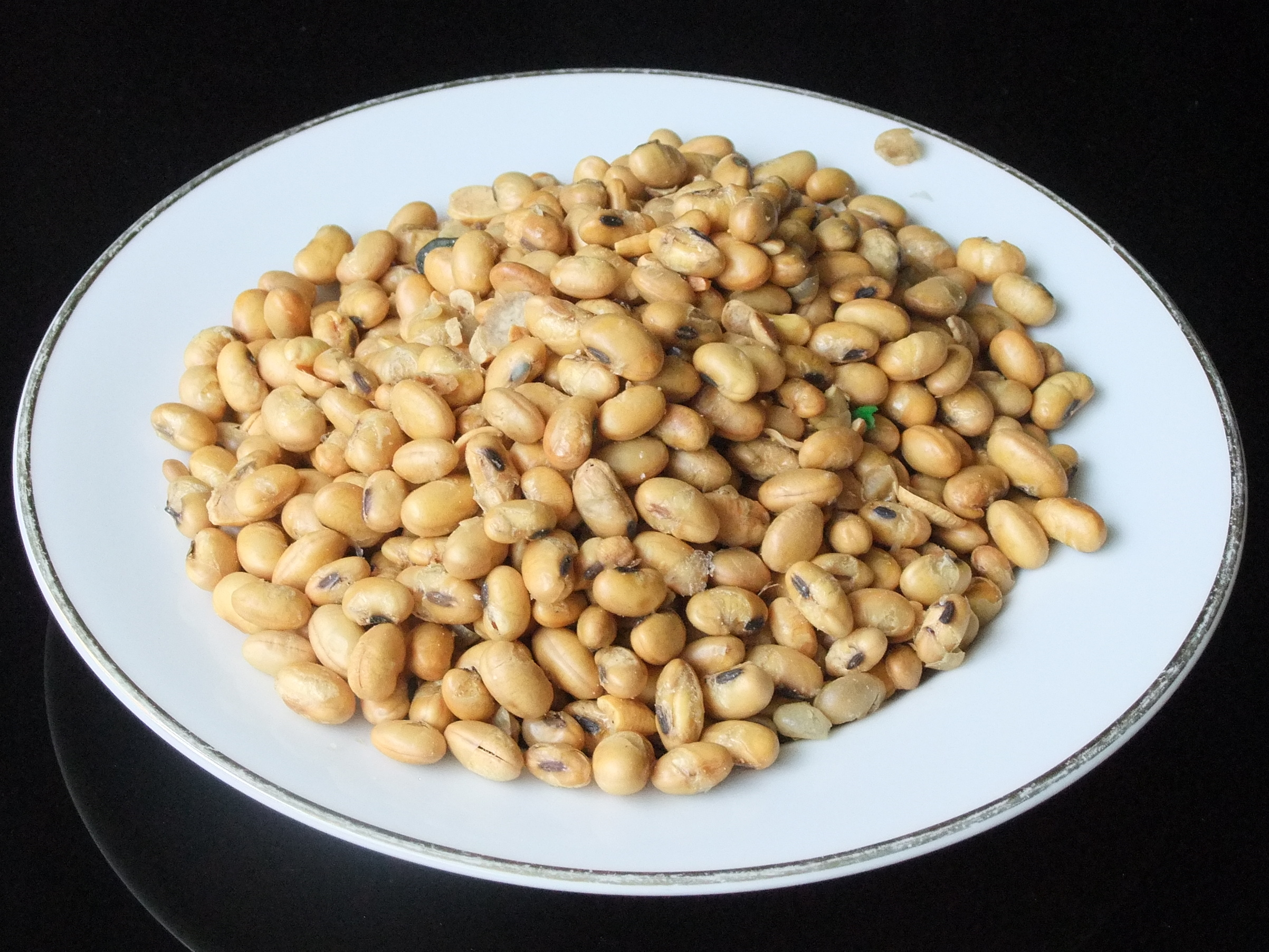
- Main ingredients: Roasted Soybean

Soy nuts are soybeans soaked in water, drained, and then baked or roasted. They can be used in place of nuts and are high in protein and dietary fiber. Soy nuts along with various soy products are common in vegan and plant-based diets all over the world as soy is a complete protein and is inexpensive to purchase.
