= Beanfeast =

Vegetarian processed food

Beanfeast was a vegetarian ultra-processed food made by Batchelors, from soya. It was sold as a dried food, in packets, to be mixed with water and boiled, the cooked product resembling mince. The product was marketed in three varieties: Savoury Mince, Bolognese Style and Mexican Chilli.

Beanfeast was the focus of protests against its manufacturer, Unilever, when it was found to contain genetically modified (GM) soya. The sales of the product dropped by 50%. After a meeting with Greenpeace in April 1999, Unilever agreed to remove GM ingredients.

The product was discontinued by Batchelors in early 2020, with the explanation that it was "not selling well".

== See also ==
- List of meat substitutes
