= 8th Continent =

Brand of soy milk

- Product type: Subsidiary
- Current owner: Stremicks Heritage Foods
- Country: United States
- Markets: United States
- Website: http://www.8thcontinent.com/

8th Continent is a brand of soy milk sold by 8th Continent, L.L.C., a subsidiary of Stremicks Heritage Foods.

8th Continent is available in Regular Original and Vanilla, Complete Vanilla, Light Original, Vanilla and Chocolate, Fat Free Original and Vanilla. 8th Continent is also lactose free, gluten free, and certified Vegan.

The 8th Continent worldwide headquarters is located in Santa Ana, California.
