= Edamame =

Immature soybean pod used as a specialty food

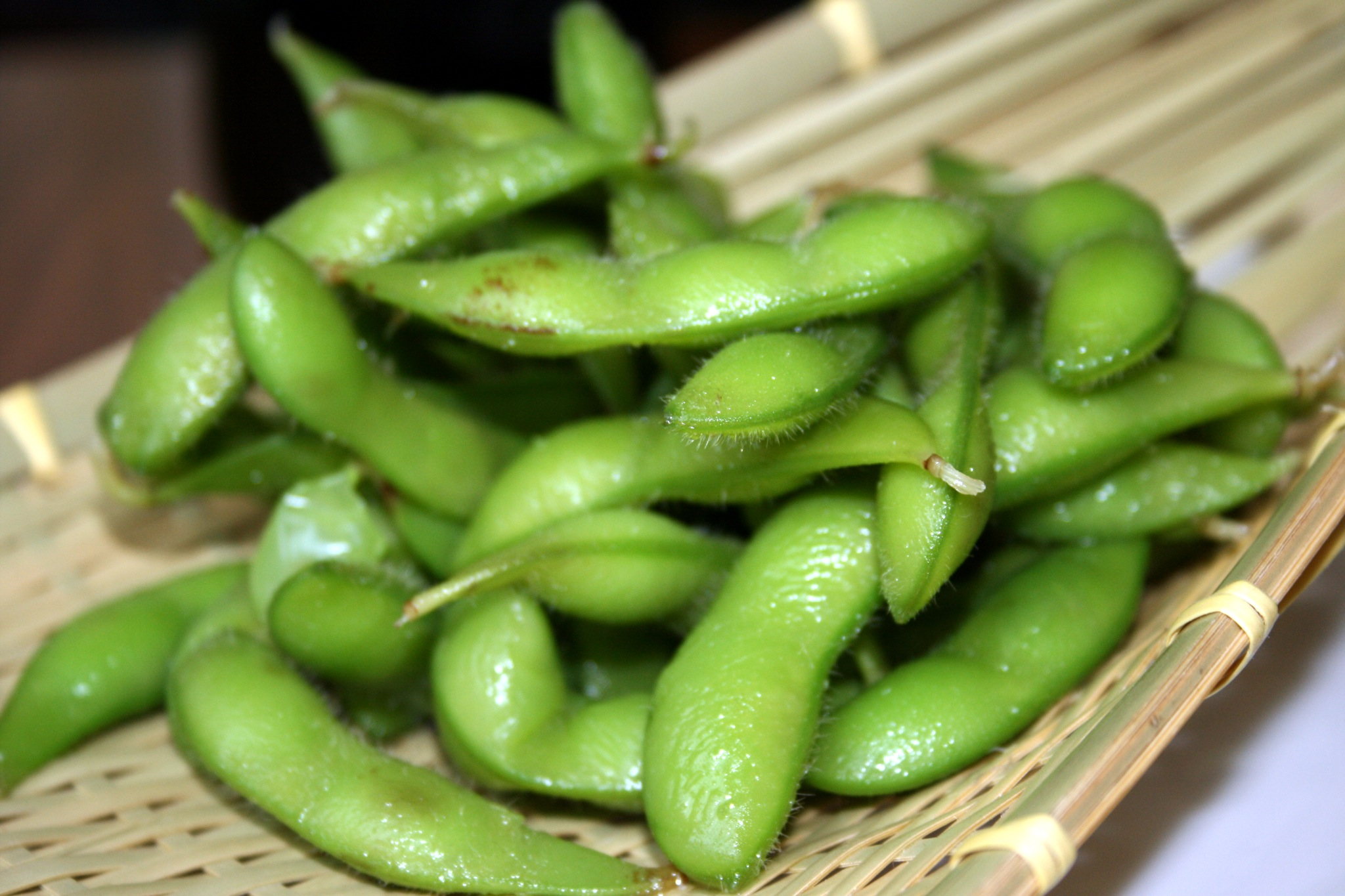
- Boiled green soybeans in the pod
- Course: Appetizer, side dish
- Place of origin: Japan, China, Philippines
- Main ingredients: Soybeans

Edamame (枝豆; /ˌɛdəˈmɑːmeɪ/) is an East Asian and Southeast Asian dish prepared with immature soybeans in their pods, which are boiled or steamed, and may be served with salt or other condiments. It is consumed in many world regions. Edamame is a common side dish in Chinese cuisine, Japanese cuisine, Filipino cuisine and as an appetizer to alcoholic beverages, such as beer or shōchū. As an ingredient, edamame is used in both sweet and savory dishes, such as takikomi gohan, tempura, and zunda-mochi. Edamame is called utaw in Filipino and maodou in Chinese.

When the beans are outside the pod, the term mukimame is also sometimes used in Japanese.

== Name ==
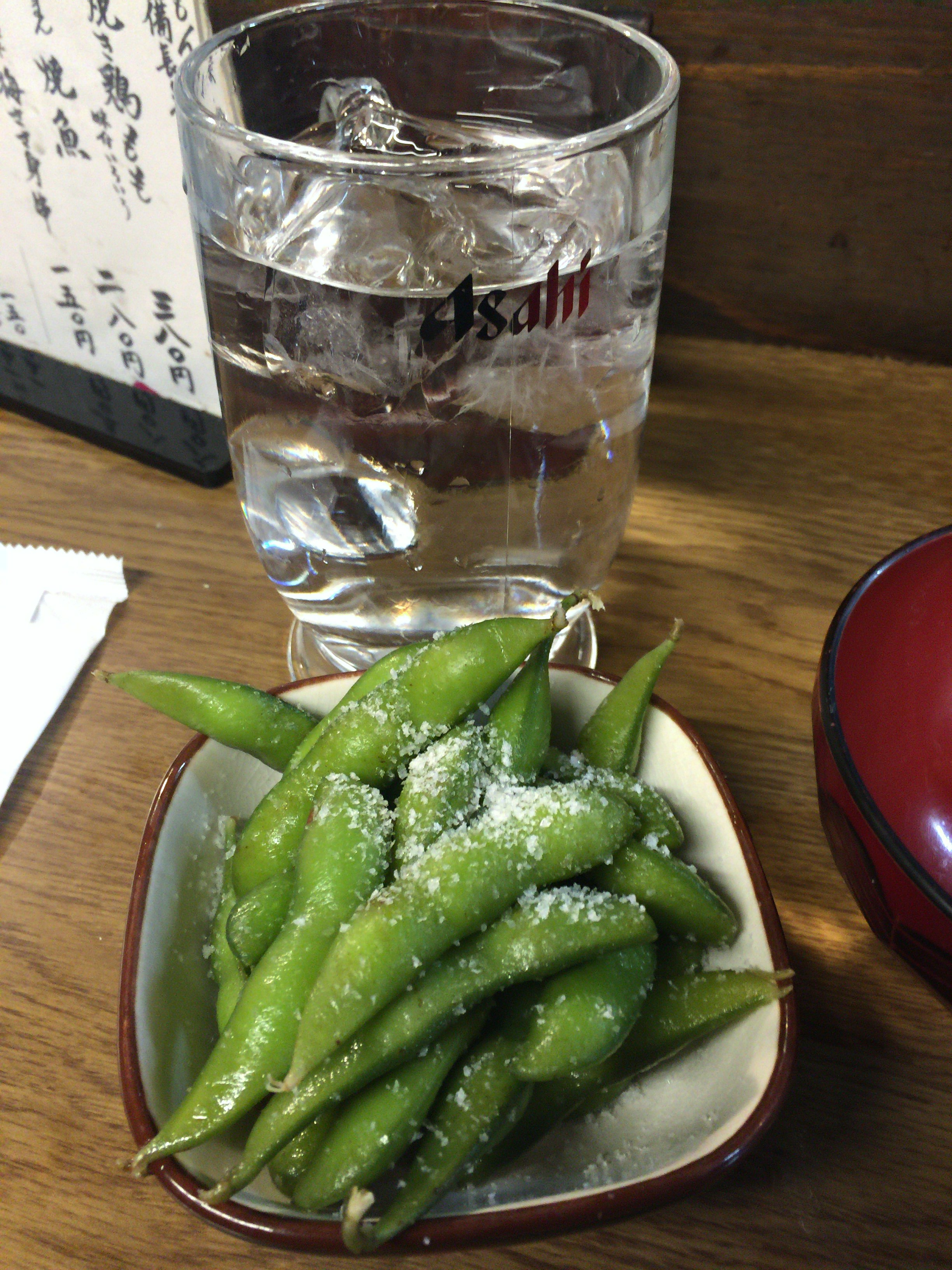
Edamame and shōchū

In Japanese, the name edamame is commonly used to refer to the dish. It literally means "stem beans" (枝 eda = "branch" or "stem" + 豆 mame = "bean"), because the beans were often sold while still attached to the stem.

In Chinese, maodou is used commonly to refer to the dish, which literally means "fur peas" (毛 máo = "fur" + 豆 dòu = "bean").

In Filipino, specifically the Tagalog language, utaw is commonly used to refer to the ingredient, the side dish, and the merienda or afternoon snack. The term is also a back slang word derived from the word tawo, meaning man, which can refer to both the human or a spirit of the land. Hundreds of distinct languages in the Philippines have distinct terms referring to edemame as well. In the Ilocano language, it is called kuttaw.

== History ==
Soybeans were first cultivated in China some 7000 years ago, while the earliest documented reference to the term "edamame" dates from the year 1275, when the Japanese monk Nichiren wrote a note thanking a parishioner for the gift of "edamame" he had left at the temple. In 1406, during the Ming dynasty in China, the leaves of the soybeans were eaten and during outbreaks of famine, it was recommended that citizens eat the beans whole or use them ground up and added to flour. Centuries later, in China, in 1620, they are referred to again, but as maodou, which translates to the term "hairy bean". Edamame appeared in haikai verse in Japanese in the Edo period (1603–1868), with one example as early as 1638.

They were first recognized in the United States in 1855, when a farmer commented on the difficulties he had shelling them after harvest. In March 1923, the immature soybean is first referred to in text in the United States in the book "The Soybean" by C. V. Piper and Joseph W. Morse. In this book, they are first pictured and shown as being eaten out of open shell pods. The first nutritional facts about them are published and some recipes are included, as they were a new type of vegetable to the public. The earliest recorded usage in English of the word edamame is in 1951 in the journal Folklore Studies. In 1970, U.S.-based distributor and importer Mutual Trading Company became the first company in the world to commercially distribute frozen edamame in the United States.

Writing in The New York Times in 1999, food writer Florence Fabricant reported that frozen edamame beans were starting to be sold in supermarkets and speciality food retailers in New York and New Jersey. Edamame appeared as a new term in the Oxford English Dictionary in 2003 and in the Merriam-Webster dictionary in 2008.

In 2008, the first soybeans grown in Europe were sold in grocery stores as edamame and eaten as an alternative source of protein.

== Preparation ==
=== Harvesting ===
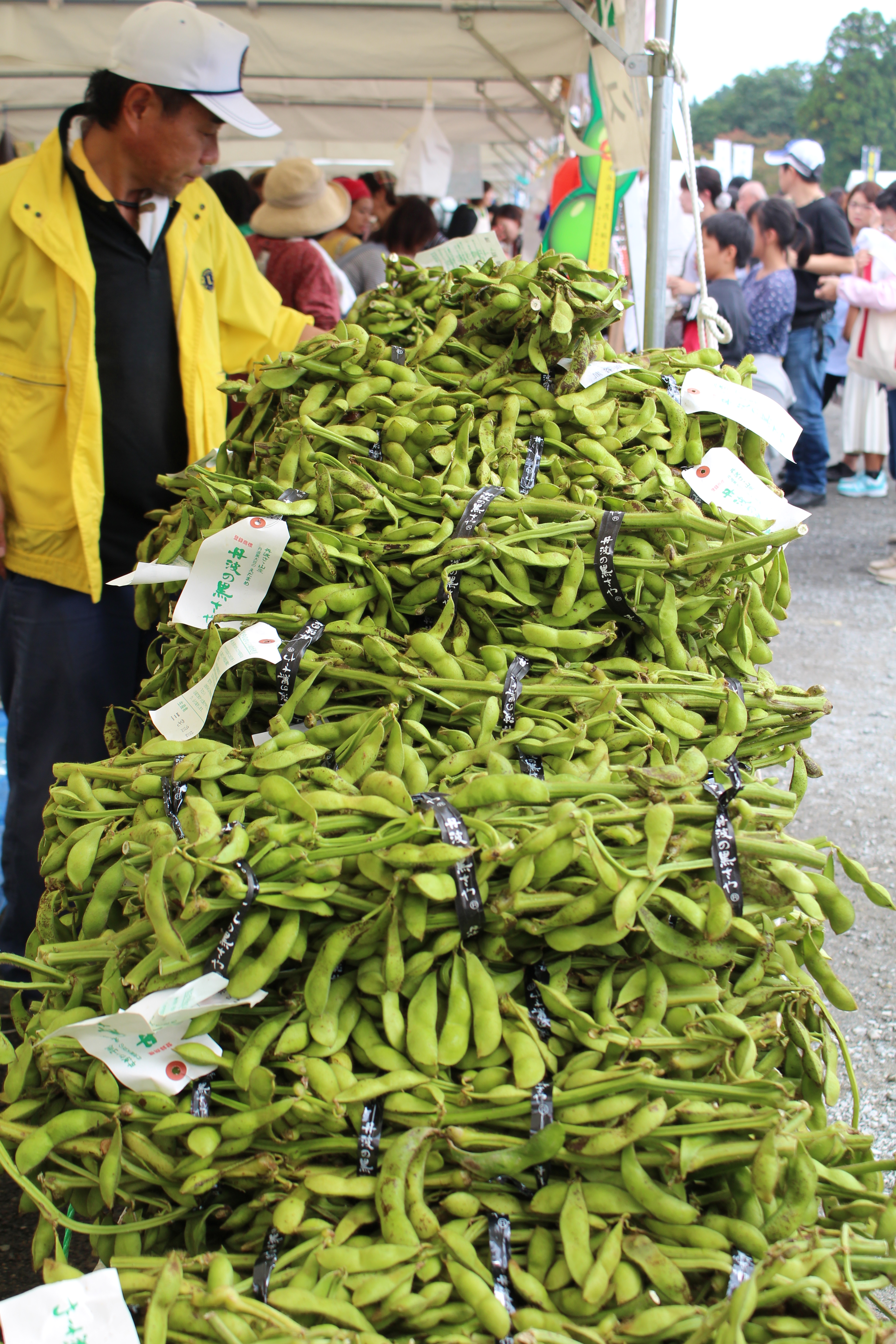
Edamame for sale in Tamba-Sasayama, Japan

Edamame is typically harvested by hand to avoid damaging the crop's stems and leaves. Green soybean pods are picked before they fully ripen, typically 35 to 40 days after the crop first flowers. Soybeans harvested at this stage are sweeter because they contain more sucrose than soybeans picked later in the growing season. Other factors contributing to edamame's flavor include free amino acids such as glutamic acid, aspartic acid, and alanine. Often these unbound amino acids decrease as the pods fully expand and ripen.

=== Cooking ===
Pods may be boiled in water, steamed, or microwaved. The ends of the pod are sometimes cut before boiling or steaming. The most common preparations use salt for taste, either dissolved in the boiling water before introducing the soybean pods or added after cooking.

Edamame is a popular side dish at Japanese izakaya restaurants with local varieties being in demand, depending on the season. Salt and garlic are typical condiments for edamame. In Japan, a coarse salt wet with brine is preferred on beans eaten directly from the pod.

=== Storage ===
Edamame purchased fresh is preferably eaten the same day, with flavor degradation being noticeable in as few as 10 hours after harvest. However, fresh edamame will stay edible for three days when stored in the refrigerator. Damaged pods brown more rapidly however, mainly due to the enzyme polyphenol oxidase. If stored fresh, the pods should be kept humid to prevent discoloration and wilting. This can be accomplished by wrapping the pods in plastic or another material which traps moisture.

Freezing fresh edamame is another option for maintaining good quality over a few months. Fresh edamame should be blanched first before being frozen.

=== Eating ===
Edamame can come in two forms: pods or beans. Edamame beans are easy to eat and can be cooked just like any other type of beans. The edamame pods require using the teeth or fingers to slide the edamame beans into the mouth, after which the pods (or shells) are discarded.

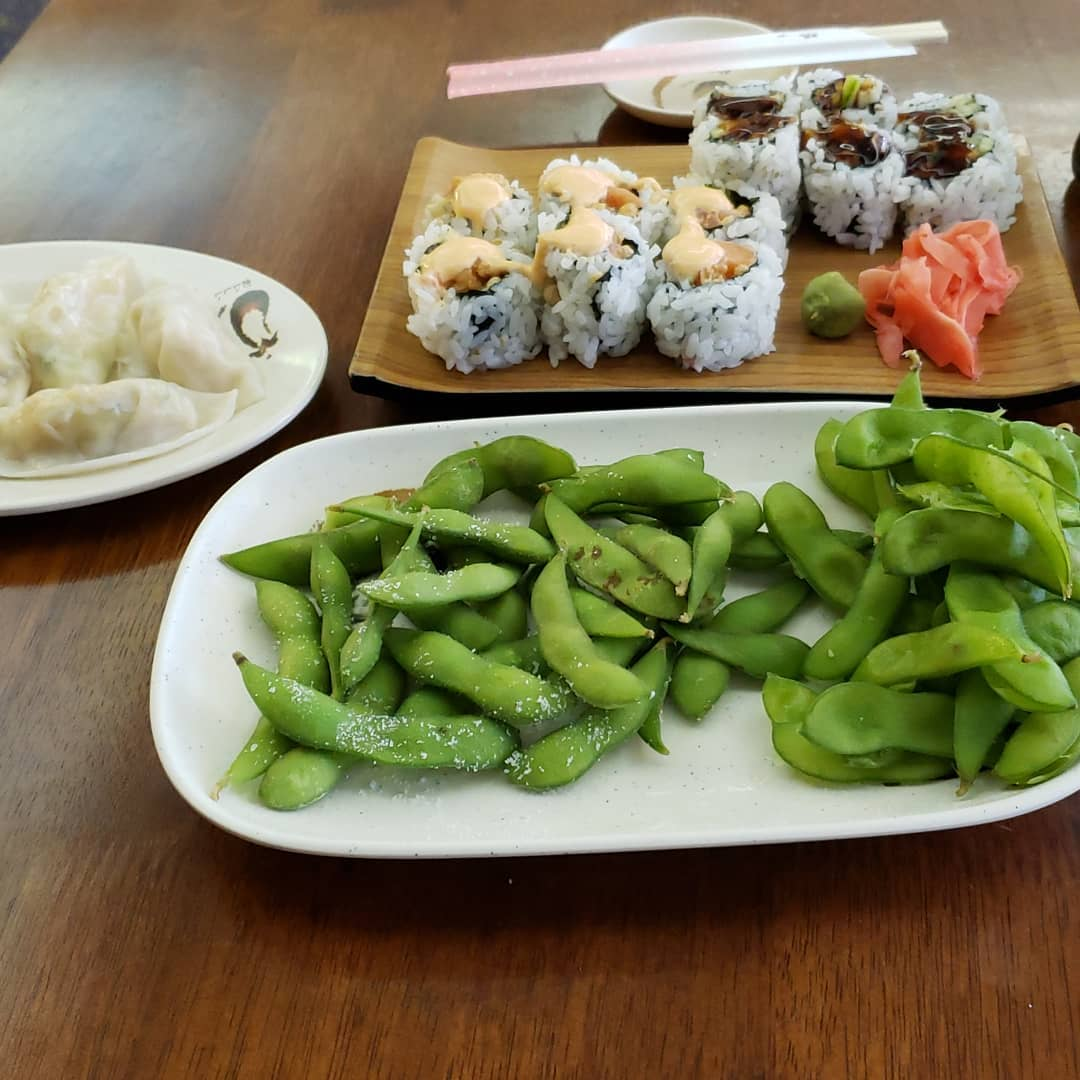
With sushi

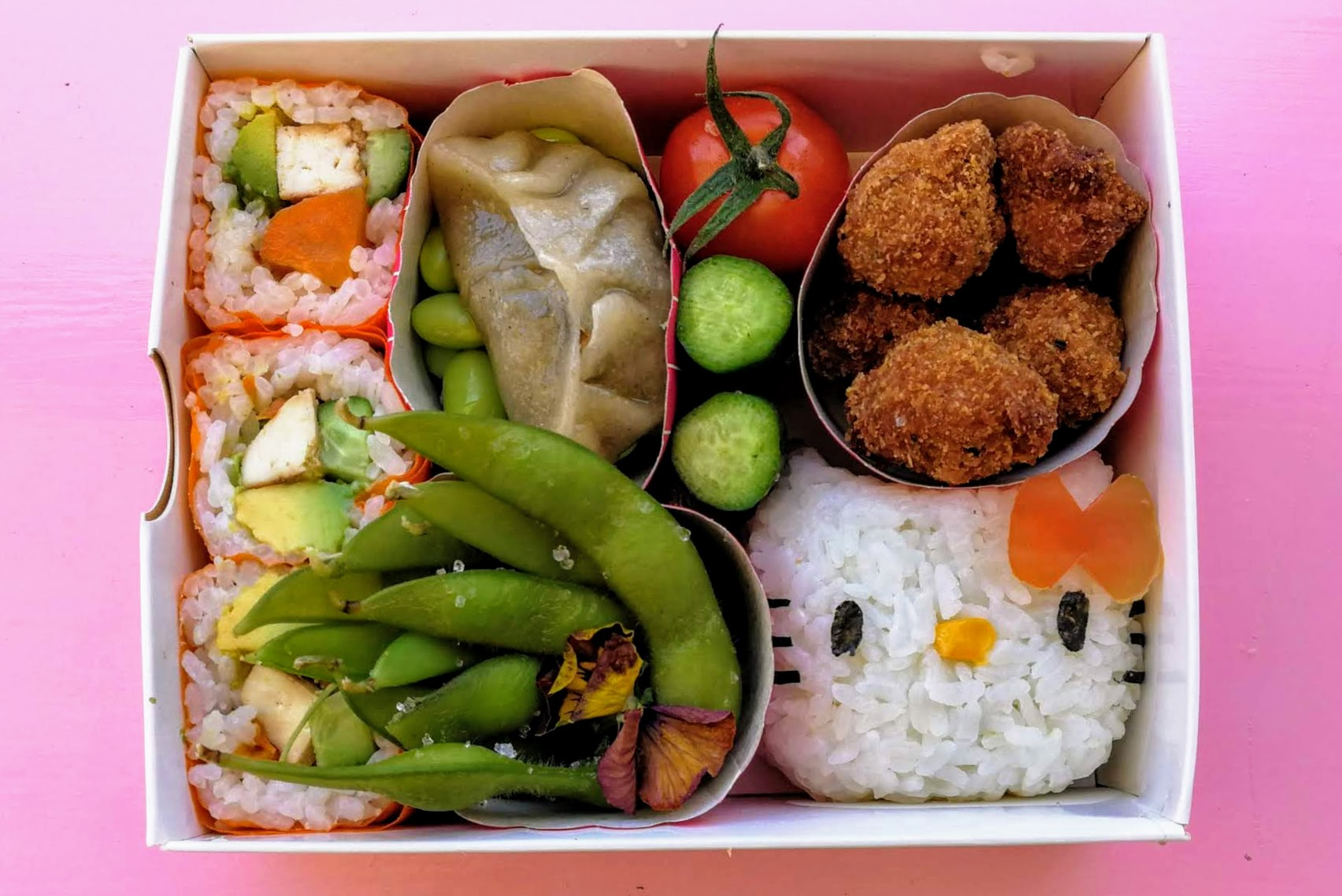
In a bento

== Nutrition ==
Edamame, frozen, prepared
Nutritional value per 100 g (3.5 oz)
- Energy: 121 kcal (510 kJ)
- Carbohydrates: 8.9 g
- Sugars: 2.18 g
- Dietary fiber: 5.2 g
- Fat: 5.2 g
- Protein: 11.9 g
Vitamins and minerals
Vitamins	Quantity %DV^{†}
Vitamin A equiv.	2% 15 μg
Thiamine (B1)	17% 0.2 mg
Riboflavin (B2)	12% 0.155 mg
Niacin (B3)	6% 0.915 mg
Pantothenic acid (B5)	8% 0.395 mg
Vitamin B6	6% 0.1 mg
Folate (B9)	78% 311 μg
Vitamin C	7% 6.1 mg
Vitamin E	5% 0.68 mg
Vitamin K	22% 26.8 μg
Minerals	Quantity %DV^{†}
Calcium	5% 63 mg
Iron	13% 2.27 mg
Magnesium	15% 64 mg
Manganese	45% 1.024 mg
Phosphorus	14% 169 mg
Potassium	15% 436 mg
Selenium	1% 0.8 μg
Zinc	12% 1.37 mg
- Other constituents: Quantity
- Water: 72.8 g
- Link to USDA Database entry
- ^{†}Percentages estimated using US recommendations for adults, except for potassium, which is estimated based on expert recommendation from the National Academies.

The United States Department of Agriculture states that edamame beans are a "soybean that can be eaten fresh and are best known as a snack with a nutritional punch". Frozen, prepared edamame beans are 73% water, 12% protein, 9% total carbohydrates, of which 5% is dietary fiber, and 5% fat. A reference amount of 100 g (3.5 oz) provides 121 calories of food energy, and rich amounts (20% or more the Daily Value, DV) of protein, dietary fiber, folate (78% DV), manganese (45% DV), and vitamin K (22% DV) (table). The fat content in edamame supplies 358 mg of omega−3 fatty acids, 1,790 mg of omega−6 fatty acids, and 1,260 mg of oleic acid (USDA reference in table).

== Allergy ==
Edamame is soy and is classed as a major food allergen, and must be clearly identified on all food ingredient labels of pre-packed foods for sale in the UK and EU.
