= Soy sauce fish =

Type of container

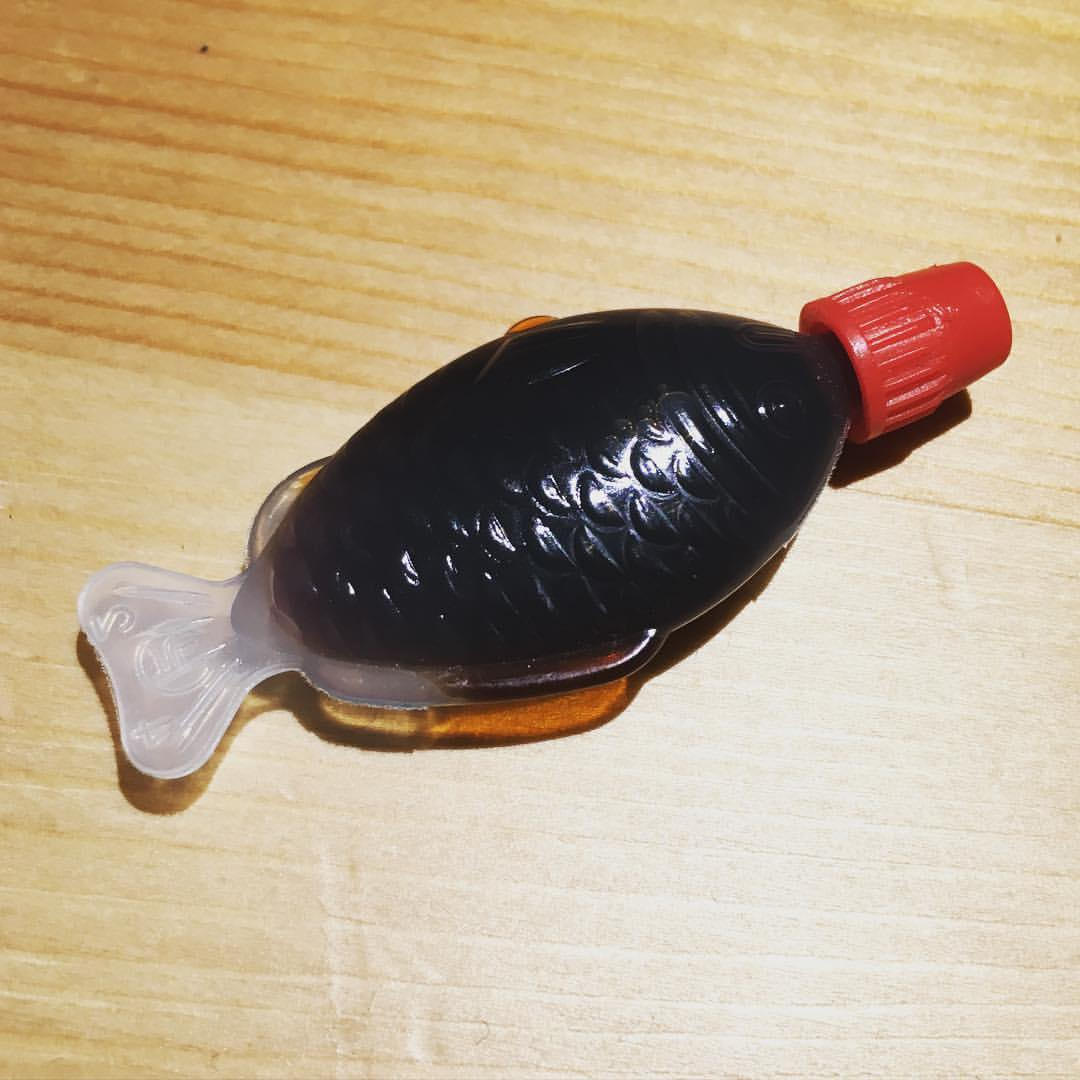
A soy sauce fish

Shoyu-tai, also known as soy sauce fishes, are small fish-shaped containers for liquid condiments such as soy sauce. They were first produced in Japan in the 1950s, originally in the shape of snappers. Although their use decreased by the 21st century, they continue to be used in bento and sushi containers and airline meals.

Soy sauce fishes have spread in use as Japanese cuisine has grown popular outside of Japan. In 2025, as part of an effort to address plastics pollution, the Australian state of South Australia became the first place in the world to ban their use.

== History ==
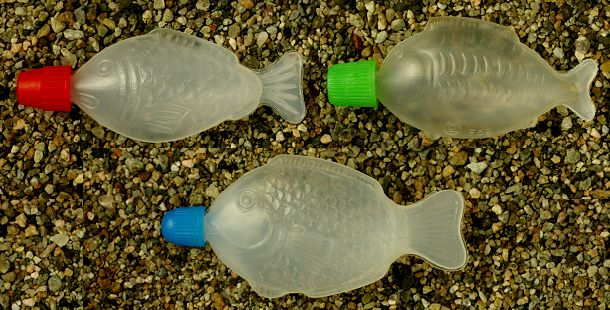
Empty soy sauce fishes of various shapes

Soy sauce fishes were invented in the 1950s by the founder of Osaka Prefecture-based manufacturer Asahi Sogyo, Teruo Watanabe. This type of container is also referred to as shoyu-tai (醤油鯛, shōyu-dai), literally "soy sauce snapper", owing to the shape of the polyethylene containers were originally produced in during the 1950s. Their use decreased by the 21st century, though they continue to be used in bento boxed meals, sushi roll containers, and airline meals.

As Japanese cuisine has grown in popularity in other countries, use of soy sauce fishes has spread alongside it. Soy sauce fishes produced by Little Soya, based in Texas, US, were set to be taken on a NASA space launch to the International Space Station in 2014.

British charity GMFA's 2015 public health campaign, Good Chems, recommended use of soy sauce fishes to measure safe dosages of recreational drugs, among other practices aimed at preventing drug overdose. It was particularly recommended for gay men using GHB: a typical soy sauce fish has a capacity of 3 millilitres (0.1 US fl oz), and the recommended safe dose of GHB is exactly half of this. In 2017, the Sydney Morning Herald reported on the illegal recreational use of 1,4-butanediol, sometimes packaged in the containers, in Melbourne nightclubs.

The sale and distribution of soy sauce fishes and rectangular soy sauce containers, among other single-use plastic products, was banned in the Australian state of South Australia in 2025 in an effort to address plastics pollution. According to deputy premier Susan Close, they were specifically banned over other condiment containers because they are "easily dropped, blown away, or washed into drains" and "too small to be captured by sorting machinery and often end up in landfill or as fugitive plastic in the environment". In response to the South Australian ban on plastic soy sauce fish, the Sydney-based design studio Heliograf invented a compostable soy sauce fish made from sugarcane pulp.

== See also ==
- Squeeze bottle
