= Soy molasses =

Viscous syrup with a typical bittersweet flavor

Soy molasses is brown viscous syrup with a typical bittersweet flavor. A by-product of aqueous alcohol soy protein concentrate production, soy molasses is a concentrated, desolventized, aqueous alcohol extract of defatted soybean flakes.

The term "soy molasses" was coined by Daniel Chajuss, the founder of Hayes Ashdod Ltd., which first commercially produced and marketed soy molasses in the early 1960s. The name was chosen to distinguish the product from “soybean whey” or “condensed soybean solubles,” which were the by-products available at the time from the production of soy protein isolate and acid-washed soy protein concentrate.

== Manufacture ==
The alcohols are removed from the liquid extract by evaporation, leaving a distillation residue that is an aqueous solution of sugars and other soy solubles. This solution is then concentrated to a viscous, honey-like consistency to produce soy molasses.

== Composition ==
Typically, soy molasses contains 50% total soluble solids. These solids consist of carbohydrates (60%), proteins and other nitrogenous substances (10%), minerals (10%), fats and lipoids (20%). The major constituents of soy molasses are sugars that include oligosaccharides (stachyose and raffinose), disaccharides (sucrose) and minor amounts of monosaccharides (fructose and glucose). Minor constituents include saponins, protein, lipid, minerals (ash), isoflavones, and other organic materials.

== Use ==
Soy molasses is used as a feed ingredient in mixed feeds as pelleting aid, added to soybean meal (e.g. by spraying it into the soybean meal desolventizer toaster), mixed with soy hulls, and used in liquid animal feed diets. Soy molasses can be used as a fermentation aid, as a prebiotic, and as an ingredient in specialized breads.

It is also possible to burn soy molasses in a dedicated boiler to generate process steam. In combination with a support fuel (e.g. natural gas, ...) the low calorific liquid can be valorized in a steam boiler.

Soy molasses is an important commercial and biological product, and a source of phytochemicals and soy sugars.
