= Zunda-mochi =

Japanese regional cuisine

Zunda-mochi ずんだ餅
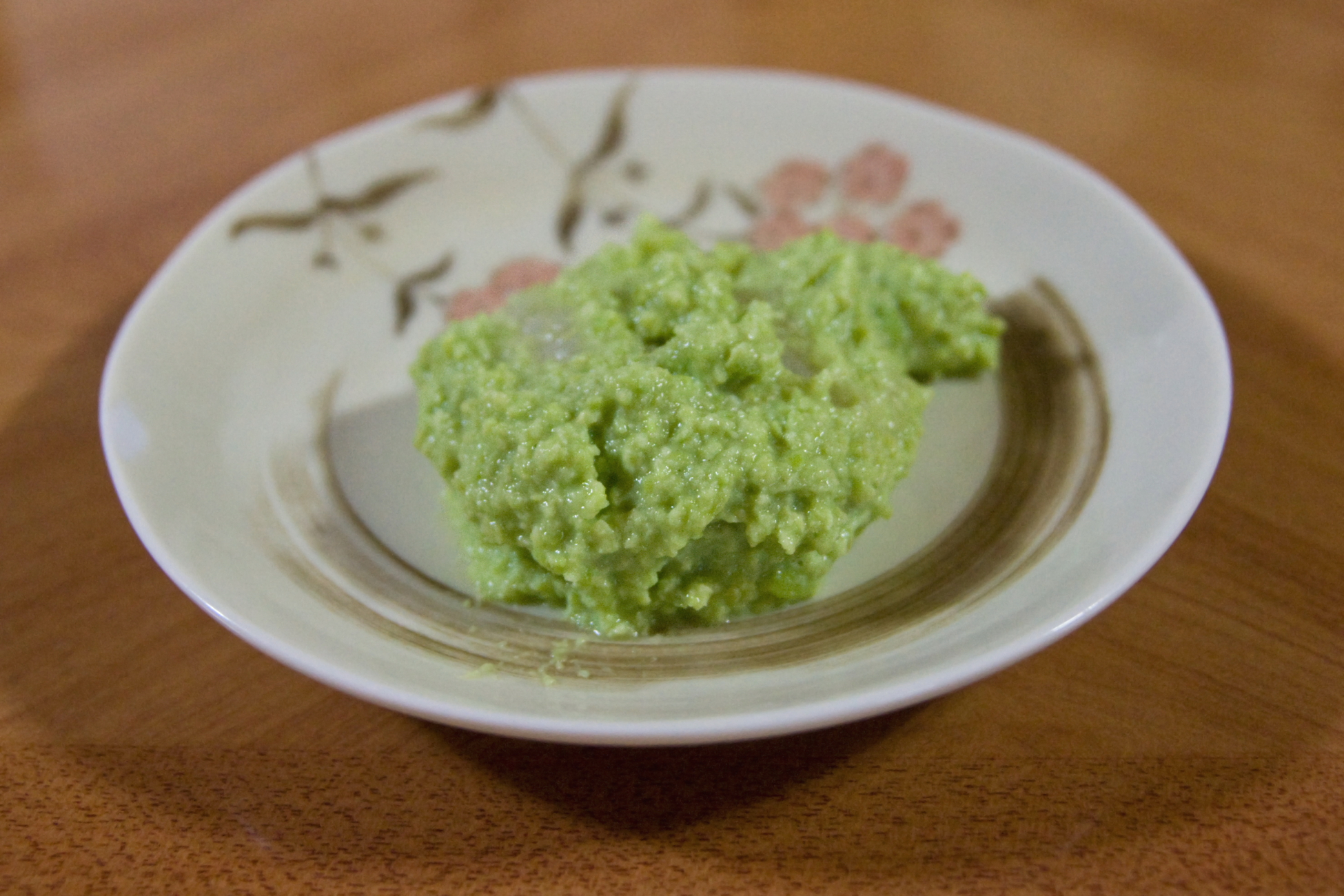
- Zunda-mochi
- Type: Confectionery
- Place of origin: Japan
- Region or state: East Asia
- Invented: 13th century?
- Main ingredients: soybeans, glutinous rice, sugar, salt
- Variations: numerous
- Similar dishes: zunda-daifuku, kurumi-mochi

Zunda-mochi (ずんだ餅) is a type of Japanese confectionery popular in northeastern Japan. It is sometimes translated as "green soybean rice cake." It generally consists of a round cake of short-grained glutinous rice with sweetened mashed soybean paste on top. In some varieties, the green soybean paste entirely covers the white rice cake. In all cases, immature soybeans known as edamame are used. A closely related product is "kurumi-mochi", which uses walnuts instead of soybeans.

== Etymology ==
There are various theories about how the term zunda-mochi arose. According to one theory, the word zunda traces its roots to zuda (豆打), which refers to "bean-mashing." Another theory suggests that zuda is derived from the jindachi sword of the famous warlord Date Masamune, who reputedly mashed beans with his sword during the Warring States period. A third theory holds that a farmer named Jinta came up with the idea for this dish. Reputedly, the warlord Date Masamune liked this farmer's idea and named the product "jinta mochi." Terms of zunda-mochi have evolved into several variants in diverse parts of northern Japan. Moreover, in some dialects the word "mochi" itself is pronounced "mozu".

== History ==
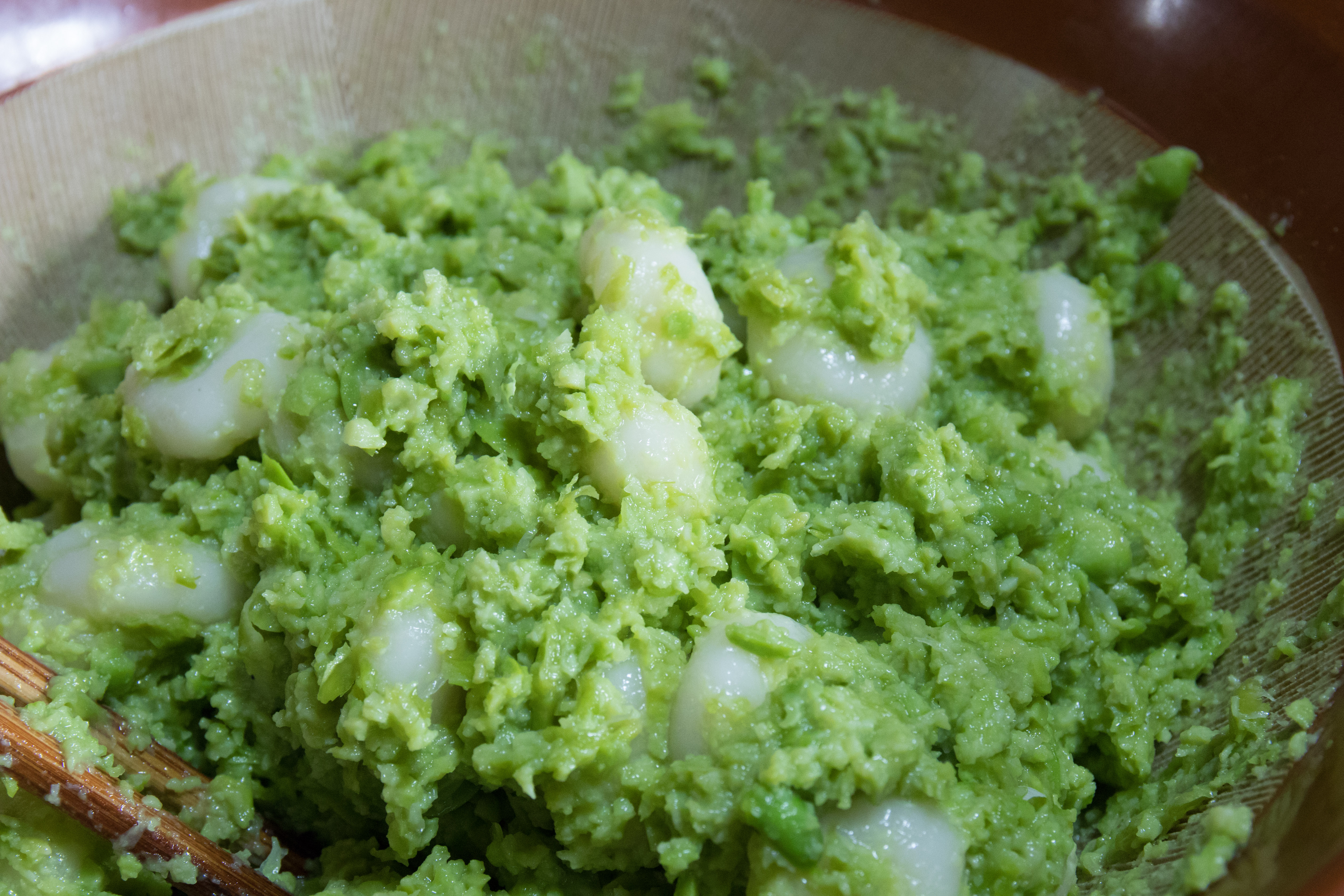

Zunda-mochi has a long history dating from at least Japan's Sengoku period. It is mentioned briefly in the diary of Prince Gosuko-in (1372–1456). Reputedly zunda-mochi was a favorite dessert of Date Masamune. It is perhaps for this reason that zunda-mochi is often regarded as a speciality of Sendai. At one time zunda-mochi was made by rice farmers soon after their summer soybean and rice harvest. It was likely used as an offering during the traditional obon and higan festivals. Eventually, it became a traditional sweet for various occasions such as weddings and funerals in some sections of northern Japan.

Today zunda-mochi is manufactured and marketed in many forms. For example, zunda-mochi gift sets are sold by Japan Post, the nation's largest mail carrier. Moreover, zunda-daifuku, which could be described as the inverse of zunda-mochi with the sticky rice on the outside and sweet bean-paste at the center, is popular in Miyagi prefecture. A related product is zunda cream dorayaki, which might be described as two pancakes with a creamy sweet soybean filling. Zunda mochi ice cream is available in some parts of Sendai city and in 2019 Häagen-Dazs even released a limited edition of that product. Since 2009 Nestlé Japan has marketed "Zunda-mochi" flavor Kit-Kat bars in some parts of northern Japan. It is also possible to buy zunda-mochi shaved ice and milkshakes not only in parts of Japan, but also Hawaii. Zunda-mochi related foods continue to evolve, often fusing elements of Western and Japanese cuisine.

== See also ==
- Mochi
- Hishi mochi
- Hanabiramochi
- List of legume dishes
- Japanese rice
