= 炸醬麵 =

炸醬麵 may refer to:

- Jjajangmyeon (炸醬麵), a Korean noodle dish
- Zhajiangmian (炸醬麵), a Chinese noodle dish
