= List of fermented soy products =

This is a list of fermented soy products. A diverse variety of soy food products made from fermented soybeans exists.

== Fermented soy products ==
Name	Image	Origin	Description
Akhuni (axone)		Nagaland, India	Axone is regarded as Sümi's (Sema) special dish, which is made of fermented soybean. Soybean is boiled, transferred to a bamboo basket and covered with leaves - preferably banana leaves. The basket is placed in a warm, humid place such as over a furnace. After several days, the fermented soybean is mashed, made into thick flat cakes and wrapped in leaves which are then smoked over a fire for up to a week before cooking. It is usually cooked with smoked pork.
Bekang		Mizoram, India	Fermented with a small amount of wood-ash for three days after boiling. Mix in the traditional Bai dish.
Hawaijar		Manipur, India	Whole soybeans fermented without salt, Hawaijar is used for making piquant relishes called ametpas as well as thick hearty stews such as Changempomba along with leafy greens and fish.
Cheonggukjang		Korea	A fermented soybean paste used in Korean cuisine that contains whole as well as ground soybeans; similar to nattō.
Doenjang		Korea	A traditional Korean fermented soybean paste. Its name literally means "thick paste" in Korean.
Doubanjiang		China	A spicy, salty paste made from fermented broad beans, soybeans, salt, rice, and various spices. Doubanjiang exists in plain and spicy versions, with the latter containing red chili peppers and called la doubanjiang. It is used particularly in Sichuan cuisine.
Douchi		China	Used in the cuisine of China, where it is most widely used for making black bean sauce, the preparation process and product are similar to ogiri and iru, both being African fermented bean products.
Fermented bean paste		East and Southeast Asia	A category of fermented foods typically made from ground soybeans, which are indigenous to the cuisines of East and Southeast Asia. In some cases, such as in the production of miso, other varieties of beans such as broad beans, may also be used.
Gochujang		Korea	A savory and pungent fermented Korean condiment made from red chili, glutinous rice, fermented soybeans and salt. Traditionally, it has been naturally fermented over years in large earthen pots outdoors, more often on an elevated stone platform, called jangdokdae.
Jajangmyeon		Shandong region, China	Consists of wheat noodles topped with a thick sauce made of chunjang (a salty black soybean paste), diced pork and vegetables, and sometimes also seafood. The dish originated from zhajiangmian in China's Shandong region.
Kinema		Nepal and India (Darjeeling and Sikkim)	A fermented soybean product indigenous to Nepal, mostly prepared by Rais and Limbus of Eastern Nepal. The traditional method of kinema preparation involves cooking of soybeans, cooling to room temperature, mixing with a small amount of vegetable ash, wrapping in banana leaves or rice straw, leaving it for 2–3 days in warm place for fermentation. It has slimy appearance and has a persistent nutty to musty flavor. Kinema resembles characteristics of Natto.
Mianchi		China	Similar to douchi but made with white soybeans
Miso		Japan	A traditional Japanese seasoning produced by fermenting rice, barley, and/or soybeans with salt and the fungus kōjikin (麹菌), the most typical miso being made with soy. The result is a thick paste used for sauces and spreads, pickling vegetables or meats, and mixing with dashi soup stock to serve as miso soup called misoshiru (味噌汁), a Japanese culinary staple.
Nattō		Japan	A traditional Japanese food made from soybeans fermented with Bacillus subtilis. It is especially popular as a breakfast food. As a rich source of protein, nattō and the soybean paste miso formed a vital source of nutrition in feudal Japan. Nattō may be an acquired taste because of its powerful smell, strong flavor, and slimy texture.
Oncom		Indonesia	A Sundanese food similar to tempeh made from the by-products of the production of other foods, including soy pulp. It comes in two varieties: red oncom (fermented with Neurospora intermedia var. oncomensis) and black oncom (fermented with Rhizopus oligosporus).
Pickled tofu		China	A form of processed, preserved tofu used in East Asian cuisine as a condiment made from soybeans. The ingredients typically are soybeans, salt, rice wine and sesame oil or vinegar, and are sold in jars containing blocks 2- to 4-cm square by 1 to 2 cm thick soaked in brine with select flavorings.
Soy sauce		China	A condiment produced from a fermented paste of boiled soybeans, roasted grain, brine, and Aspergillus oryzae or Aspergillus sojae molds. After fermentation, the paste is pressed, producing a liquid, which is the soy sauce, and a solid byproduct, which is often used as animal feed. Soy sauce is a traditional ingredient in East and Southeast Asian cuisines, where it is used in cooking and as a condiment. It originated in China in the 2nd century BCE and spread throughout Asia. In recent times, it is used in Western cuisine and prepared foods. See also: Sweet soy sauce.
Stinky tofu		China	A form of fermented tofu that has a strong odor. Unlike cheese, stinky tofu fermentation does not have a fixed formula for starter bacteria; wide regional and individual variations exist in manufacture and preparation. The traditional method for producing stinky tofu is to prepare a brine made from fermented milk, vegetables, and meat; the brine can also include dried shrimp, amaranth greens, mustard greens, bamboo shoots, and Chinese herbs. The brine fermentation can take as long as several months.
Tamari		Japan	Produced mainly in the Chūbu region of Japan, tamari is darker in appearance and richer in flavor than koikuchi, Japan's most-produced soy sauce. It contains little or no wheat. Wheat-free tamari can be used by people with gluten intolerance. It is the "original" Japanese soy sauce, as its recipe is closest to the soy sauce originally introduced to Japan from China. Technically, this variety is known as miso-damari (味噌溜り), as this is the liquid that runs off miso as it matures.
Tauchu		China	A paste made from preserved soybeans and often used when steaming fish in Hubei cuisine.
Tauco		Indonesia	A paste made from preserved fermented yellow soybeans in Chinese Indonesian cuisine. The name comes from the pronunciation in the Hokkien dialect and it is originated from China. The sauce is also commonly used in other Indonesian cuisines traditions, such as Sundanese cuisine and Javanese cuisine. The sauce is often used as condiment and flavoring for stir fried dishes.
Tempeh		Indonesia	A traditional soy product originally from Indonesia. It is made by a natural culturing and controlled fermentation process that binds soybeans into a cake form, similar to a very firm vegetarian burger patty. Tempeh is unique among major traditional soy foods in that it is the only one that did not originate from the Sinosphere cuisine.
Thua nao		Myanmar, Thailand	Fermented soybeans in fresh or dried forms, indigenous to the Shan people of Myanmar and Thailand
Tianmianjiang (Sweet bean sauce)		China	A thick, dark brown- or black-colored Chinese sauce made from wheat flour, sugar, salt, mantou, and fermented yellow soybeans (the lees left over from the fermentation of soybeans to make soy sauce). There are many different types of sweet bean sauces depending on the different compositions and the different method of production, and significant regional variations exist.
Tungrymbai		India	A fermented soy product indigenous to the Khasi and Jaiñtia tribes in Meghalaya, India.
Tương		Vietnam	A name applied to a variety of condiments, Tương is a fermented bean paste made from soybean and commonly used in Vietnamese cuisine. It may range in consistency from a thick paste to a thin liquid.
Yellow soybean paste		China	A fermented paste made from yellow soybeans, salt, and water; wheat flour, though not formerly used, is often used as an additional ingredient in the modern day, and potassium sorbate may also be used as a preservative. Yellow soybean paste is produced in China and is used primarily in Beijing cuisine and other cuisines of northern China.
Pehak		India	it is prepared with fermented soybeans and Bhut Jolokia

== See also ==
- List of fermented foods
- List of food pastes
- List of meat substitutes
- List of soy-based foods
- Sweet bean paste
