= Tuong =

Tuong may refer to:

- Tuồng, classical Vietnamese theatre or "Vietnamese opera"
- Tương, term used for various sauces and pastes used in Vietnamese cuisine
- Xiang Commandery (Chinese: 象郡) or Tượng Commandery, a commandery from 214–76 BC under the Qin, Nanyue (Nam Việt), and Western Han dynasties, likely in northern Vietnam and parts of southern China
