= Cheonggukjang =

Korean fermented soybeans

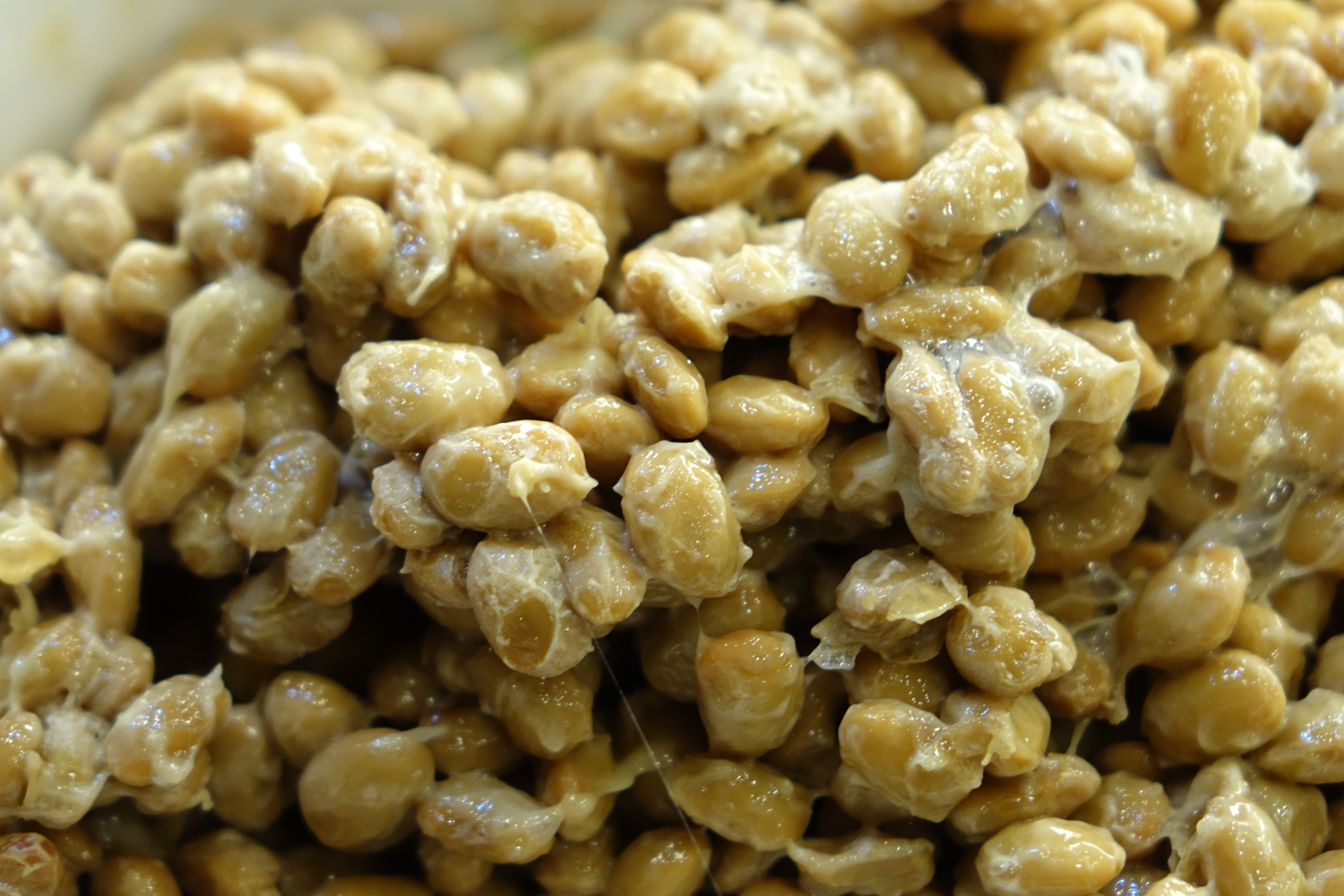
- Place of origin: Goguryeo (Korea)
- Region or state: East Asia
- Main ingredients: Soybean
- Similar dishes: Natto

Korean name
- Hangul: 청국장
- Hanja: 淸麴醬
- RR: cheonggukjang
- MR: ch'ŏnggukchang
- IPA: tɕʰʌŋ.ɡuk̚.t͈ɕaŋ

Cheonggukjang (Korean: 청국장; Hanja: 淸麴醬) is a traditional Korean food made by fermenting soybeans. It contains whole, as well as ground soybeans.

== Production ==
It can be made in two to three days through fermentation of boiled soybeans, adding Bacillus subtilis, which is usually contained in the air or in the rice straw, at about 40 °C without adding salt, compared with the much longer fermentation period required for doenjang, another, less pungent variety of Korean soybean paste. Like many forms of doenjang, cheonggukjang is paste-like in texture, but also includes some whole, uncrushed soybeans.

Cheonggukjang may also be made by fermenting boiled soybeans in a warm place, pounding a portion of them, and adding salt and red chili powder.

== Food culture ==
Cheonggukjang is most often used to prepare a stew, which is also simply called cheonggukjang, but may be called cheonggukjang jjigae to avoid confusion. Cheonggukjang jjigae often includes additional ingredients, such as potatoes, onions, and tofu.

== History ==
There is no known historical source of where cheonggukjang originated from. One theory proposed by Chinese scholars is that cheonggukjang was introduced by what is now China to the Korean peninsula during the Joseon era.

However, Samkukjiwijidongijeon (Records of the Three Kingdoms, 三國志魏志東夷傳) suggests that cheonggukjang has existed in the Korean peninsula since before the Joseon era, as there are records of such fermented foods dating back to first century BC, throughout the Koryo dynasty and the Kingdom of Silla.

== Nutrition and health ==
Cheonggukjang is generally considered to be a healthy food (particularly in the winter), as it is rich in vitamins and other nutrients, though its very strong odor is not universally enjoyed. Doenjang may be used to replace it by people who dislike the smell.

In 1993, odorless cheonggukjang was invented by Dr. Hyun Kyu Joo, a former professor at Kunkook University, who later obtained a patent in 1998 for a method for removing cheonggukjang's characteristic smell.

Cheonggukjang is also believed to aid in digestion. For this purpose, cheonggukjang pills are produced in South Korea.

== See also ==
- Doenjang – Korean fermented bean paste
- Douchi – Fermented and salted black soybeans
- Fermented bean paste – Fermented foods made from ground soybeans
- Jjigae – Category of Korean stews
- Korean cuisine
- List of fermented foods
- List of fermented soy products
- Natto – Japanese fermented soybeans
