= Yellow sauce =

Yellow sauce can refer to one of two condiments:

- Yellow soybean paste - a fermented paste made from yellow soybeans, salt, and water used in Chinese cuisine.
- Mustard (condiment) - a condiment made from the seeds of a mustard plant commonly added to sandwiches, hamburgers, corn dogs, and hot dogs.
