= Fermented bean paste =

Fermented foods made from ground soybeans

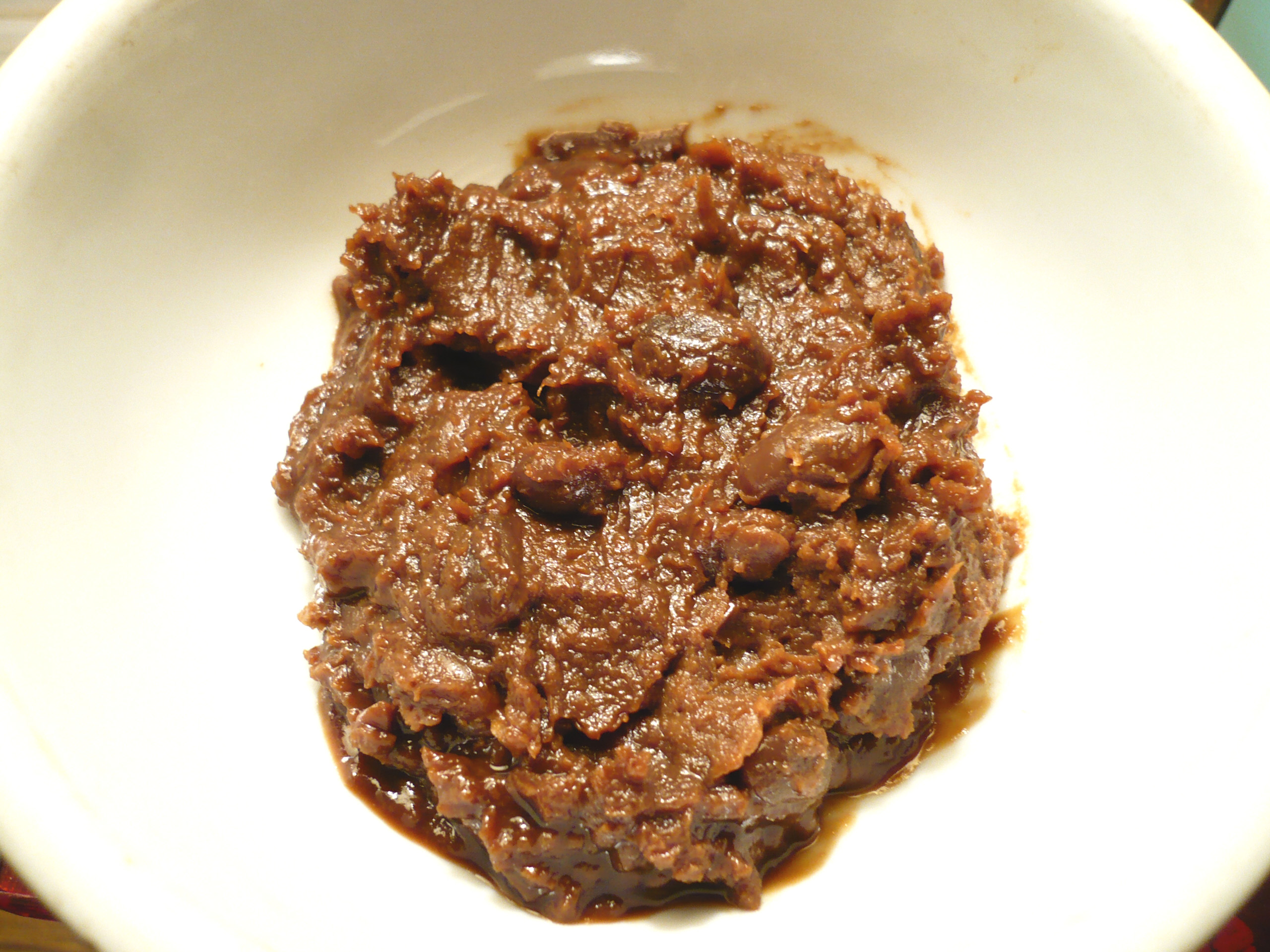
A bowl of doenjang, Korean fermented soybean paste

Fermented bean paste is a category of fermented foods typically made from ground soybeans, which are indigenous to the cuisines of East, South and Southeast Asia. In some cases, such as the production of miso, other varieties of beans, such as broad beans, may also be used.

The pastes are usually salty and savoury, but may also be spicy, and are used as a condiment to flavour foods such as stir-fries, stews, and soups. The colours of such pastes range from light tan to reddish brown and dark brown. The differences in colour are due to different production methods, such as the conditions of fermentation, the addition of wheat flour, pulverized mantou, rice, or sugar and the presence of different microflora, such as bacteria or molds used in their production, as well as whether the soybeans are roasted (as in chunjang) or aged (as in tauco) before being ground.

Fermented bean pastes are sometimes the starting material used in producing soy sauces, such as tamari, or an additional product created from the same fermented mass. The paste is also the main ingredient of hoisin sauce.

Due to the protein content of the beans, the fermentation process releases a large amount of free amino acids, which when combined with the large amounts of salt used in its production, produces a highly umami product. This is particularly true with miso, which can be used as the primary ingredient in certain dishes, such as miso soup.

== Types ==
Various types of fermented bean paste (all of which are based on soy and cereal grains) include:

Food	Cuisine of	Region
Cheonggukjang	Korea	East Asia
Dajiang	China	East Asia
Doenjang	Korea	East Asia
Doubanjiang	China	East Asia
Douchi	China	East Asia
Gochujang	Korea	East Asia
Huangjiang (yellow soybean paste)	China	East Asia
Kinema	Nepal	South Asia
Miso	Japan	East Asia
Pon ye gyi	Myanmar (Burma)	Southeast Asia
Tauco	Indonesia	Southeast Asia
Tauchu, taucu, tocu	Malaysia, China (Southern Min)	Southeast Asia and East Asia
Tao jiew	Thailand	Southeast Asia
Tempeh	Indonesia	Southeast Asia
Tianmianjiang	China	East Asia
Tương	Vietnam	Southeast Asia
Thua nao	Myanmar (Burma, Shan people), Laos, Thailand	Southeast Asia
Tungrymbai	Meghalaya, India	South Asia

== See also ==
- Bean dip
- List of fermented soy products
- Sweet bean paste
