= Chunjang =

Chunjiang may refer to:

- Junjang, military rank equivalent of brigadier general in South Korea
- Korean name for Tianmian sauce
