= Douchi =

Fermented and salted black soybeans

Douchi (豆豉)
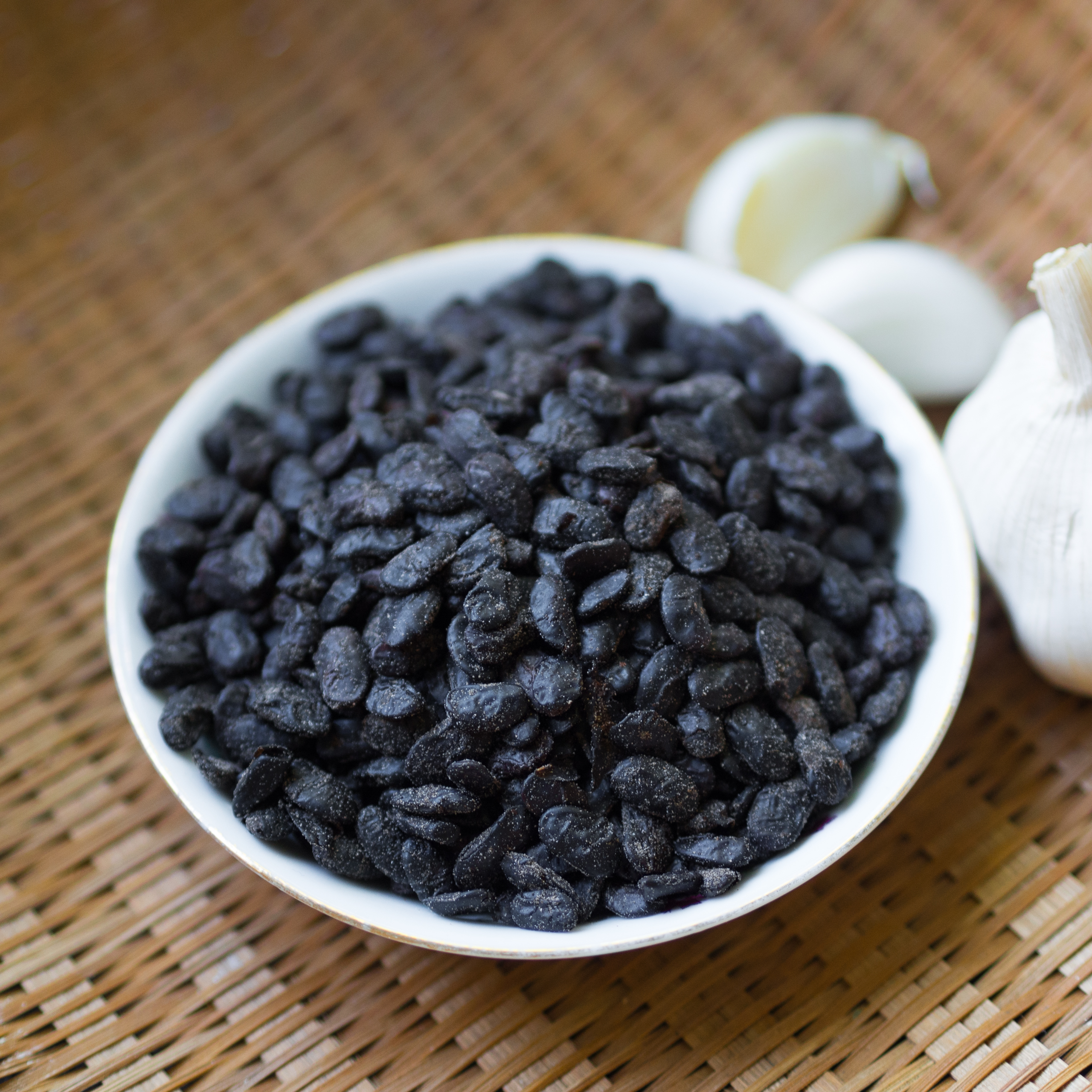
- A close-up of black soybean douchi
- Place of origin: Chinese
- Main ingredients: Fermented soybean

Douchi
- Douchi in Chinese characters
- Chinese: 豆豉
- Hanyu Pinyin: dòuchǐ
- Jyutping: dau^{6}-si^{6}
Transcriptions
Standard Mandarin
- Hanyu Pinyin: dòuchǐ
- IPA: [tôʊ.ʈʂʰɨ̀]
Yue: Cantonese
- Yale Romanization: dauh-sih
- Jyutping: dau^{6}-si^{6}
- IPA: [tɐw˨.si˨]
Southern Min
- Hokkien POJ: tāu-sīⁿ

Douchi (Chinese: 豆豉; pinyin: dòuchǐ), also known as doushi, shi, or tochi, is a group of fermentation-processed soybean foods most popular in the cuisine of China. The most common type of douchi, made from salted black soybeans and typically called fermented black soybeans (Chinese: 黑豆豆豉; pinyin: hēidòu dòuchǐ), Chinese fermented black beans, or salted black beans, is most widely used for making black bean sauce dishes.

Douchi is made by natural fermentation of soybeans. Douchi can be classified as mold-fermented douchi (Aspergillus-type, Mucor-type, or Rhizopus-type) or bacteria-fermented douchi (typically Bacillus-type).

There are two main stages to the typical douchi-making process: first cooked black soybeans undergo natural mold growth and fermentation, then they are salted to continue fermentation. A maturation stage may follow, in which the douchi is aged in brine or with other ingredients to develop flavor. The process turns the beans soft, and if allowed, semi-dry.

When regular (yellow) soybeans are used, the process does not produce "salted black beans"; instead, the beans become brown. The smell is sharp, pungent, and spicy; the taste is salty, somewhat bitter and sweet. Products made with yellow soybeans include shuidouchi (bacteria-fermented) and mianchi (mold-fermented).

Chinese fermented black beans are not the same as the black turtle bean, a variety of common bean that is commonly used in the cuisines of Central America, South America, and the Caribbean.

== History ==
Fermented black soybeans are the oldest-known food made from soybeans. In 165 BCE, they were placed, clearly marked, in Han Tomb No. 1 at Mawangdui Tomb Site in South Central China. The tomb was sealed about 165 BCE and was first opened in 1972. The high-ranking woman to whom the undisturbed tomb belonged was probably the wife of the first Marquis of Tai.

Written in 90 BCE, the Records of the Grand Historian (aka the Shiji), by Sima Qian, Chapter 69, refers to 1,000 earthenware vessels of mold-fermented cereal grains and salty fermented soybeans (shi). They were now an important commodity in China. When the prince of Huainan Liu An (legendary inventor of tofu) was exiled for inciting rebellion (in 173 BCE) against his brother, the Han Emperor Wendi, he and his retinue were, nevertheless, provided with such necessities of life as firewood, rice, salt, shi (fermented black soybeans), and cooking utensils. This date, 173 BCE, is before Han Tomb No. 1 at Mawangdui was sealed.

== Use ==
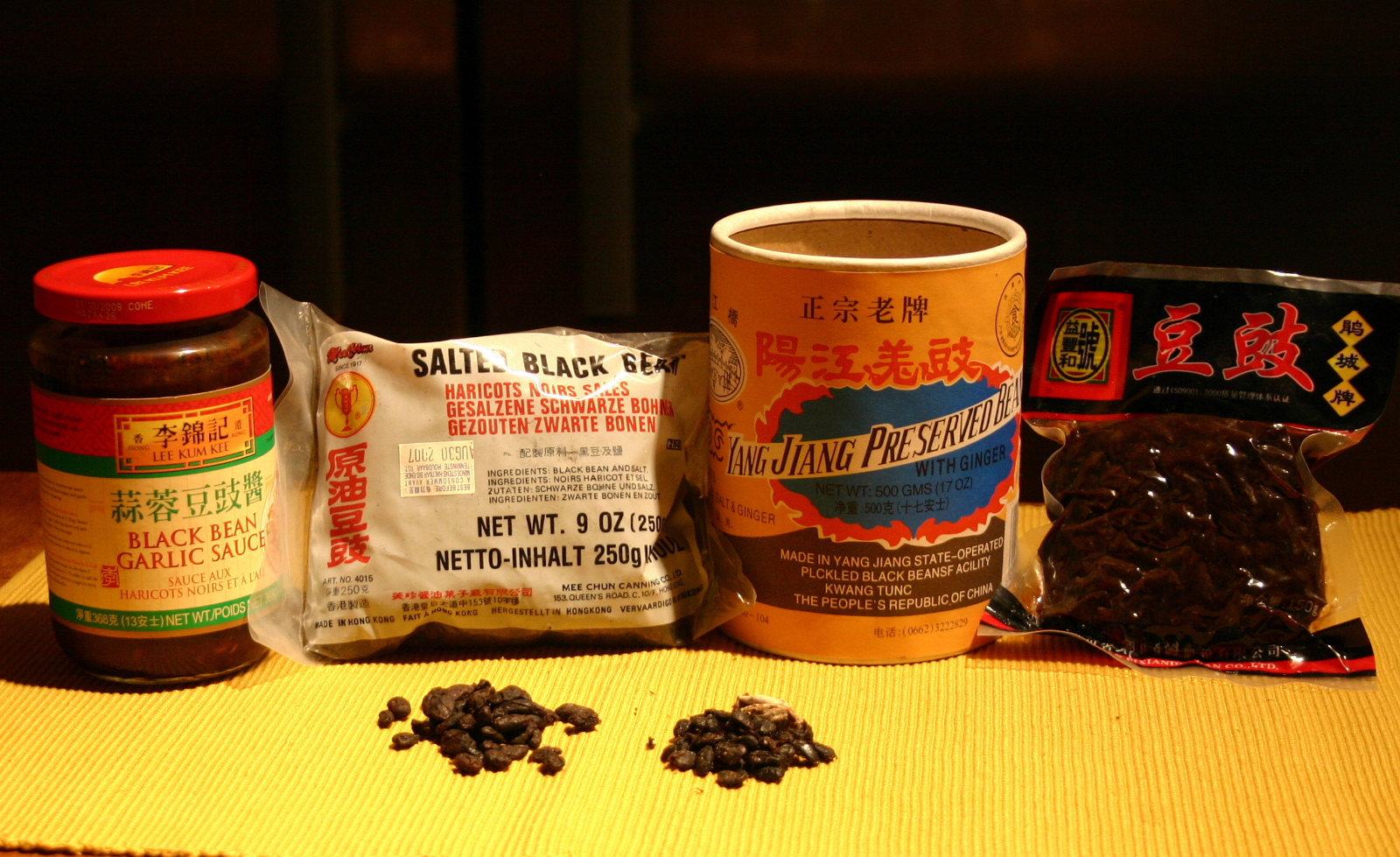
Several varieties of douchi and douchi products

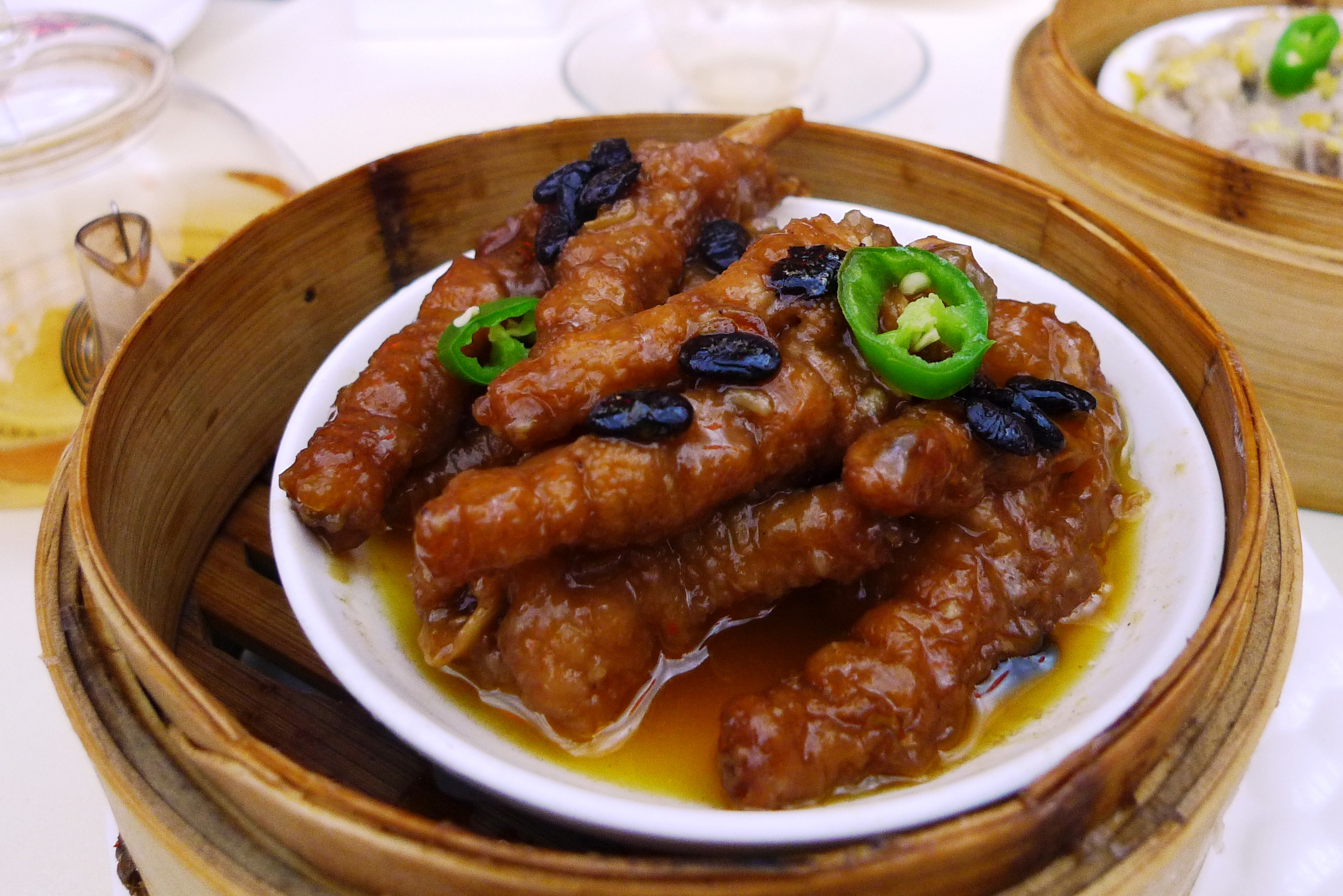
Chicken feet dim sum with preserved black beans

Douchi is used as an ingredient for mapo tofu. It is also used to flavor fish or stir-fried vegetables (particularly bitter melon and leaf vegetables). Unlike some other fermented soybean-based foods such as nattō or tempeh, douchi is used only as a seasoning, and is not meant to be consumed in large quantities, being typically much saltier.

Small packets of douchi are often available where Chinese foods are sold.

Some common dishes made with douchi are steamed spare ribs with fermented black beans and chili pepper (豉椒排骨), and fried dace with salted black beans (豆豉鯪魚).

=== Around the world ===
Fermented black soybeans are an ancient traditional food, used as condiments and seasonings in many Far Eastern countries and Chinese diaspora communities, where they are known by a variety of names.

- In Japanese, douchi is also referred to as daitokuji natto, hamanatto, hamananatto, shiokara-natto, and tera-natto, sometimes using the same Han characters (豆豉), similar ones (豆鼓), or completely different ones; however, they are almost never known by their Chinese name Zushi (豆豉 or ずし).
- In Korea, a similar black bean sauce made from roasted soy beans called chunjang is used in the well-known jjajangmyeon. It was first introduced by Chinese settlers in Incheon in the early 20th century; chunjang has made several changes and evolutionary steps over time.
- In Thailand, this sauce is called เต้าซี่ ("tausi") and is made from the black soybean. Normally, Chinese Thais use it for original old Chinese recipe such as sauce, steam etc.
- In Vietnam, this sauce is called tàu xì or đậu xị and is made from the black soybean.
- In Cambodia, douchi is also referred to as seang, or fermented salted bean, in the Khmer language, and is a common recipe. It is often used with the fermented salted fish prahok.
- In Philippine cuisine, it is called tausi in Cebuano and Tagalog, both derived from the Lan-nang tāu-sīⁿ (豆豉). It is often used when steaming fish.
- In Cantonese-speaking regions, douchi is referred to as dau^{6}si^{6} ("douchi") or haak^{1}dau^{2} dau^{6}si^{6} ("black-bean douchi").
- In Chinese Indonesian cuisine, it is called tausi which is derived from its Hokkien name. It is usually used in kakap tahu tausi, which is stir-fried red snapper, tofu, and douchi.
- In Hispanophone parts of Latin America, douchi is commonly referred to as tausí or tau-sí.
- Similar African fermented products are ogiri and iru.

== Black bean paste ==
A condiment called black bean paste, black bean sauce (豆豉醬), black bean garlic sauce (蒜蓉豆豉酱), or tochidjan (豆豉醬), prepared from douchi, garlic, and soy sauce, is popular in Chinese cuisine.

== See also ==
- List of fermented foods
- List of fermented soy products
- Yellow soybean paste
