= Tương =

Condiment made from soybeans

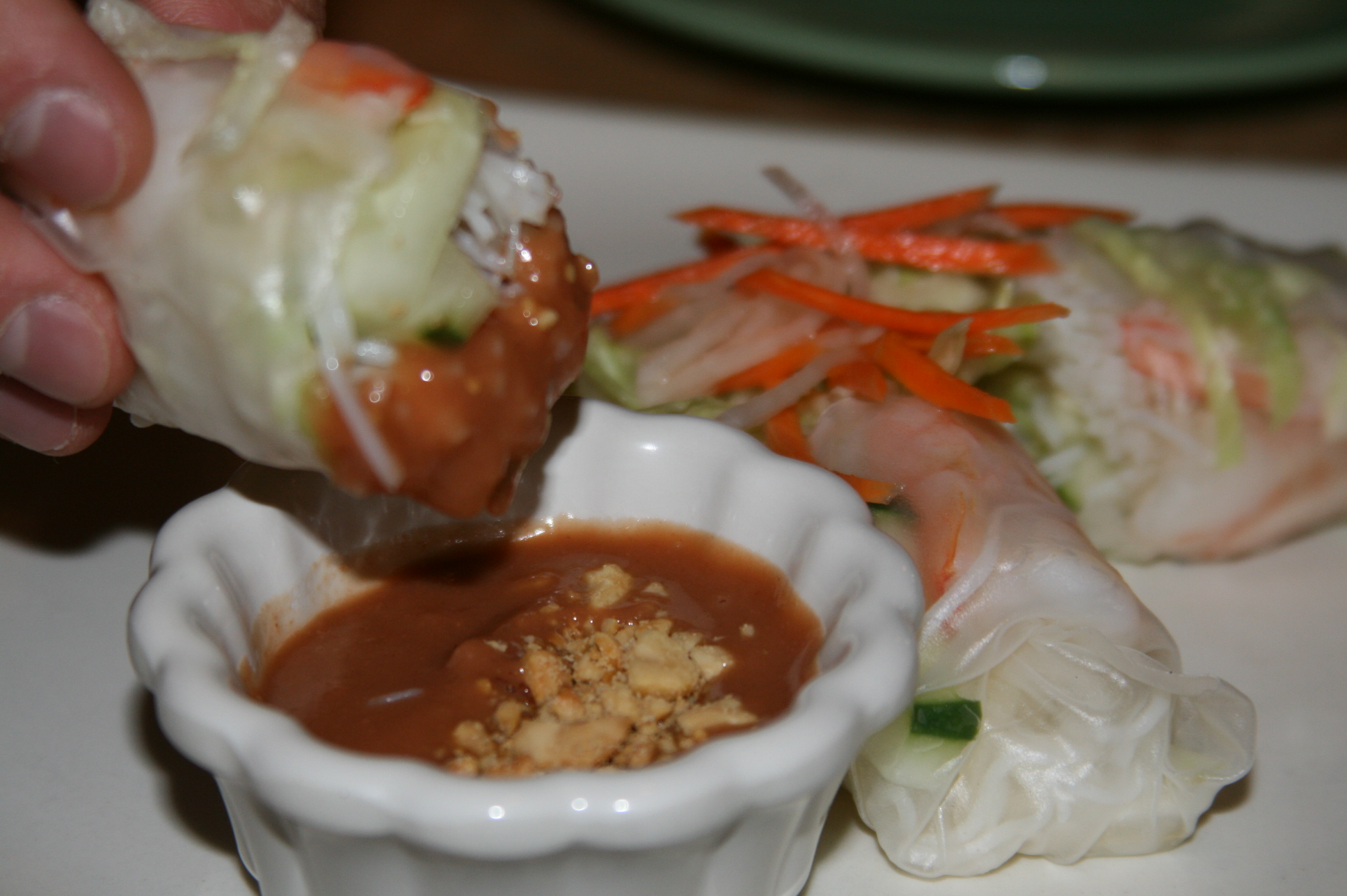
- Gỏi cuốn with tương
- Alternative names: Soybean paste
- Type: Seasoning
- Place of origin: Vietnam
- Associated cuisine: Vietnamese
- Main ingredients: Fermented soybeans, salt

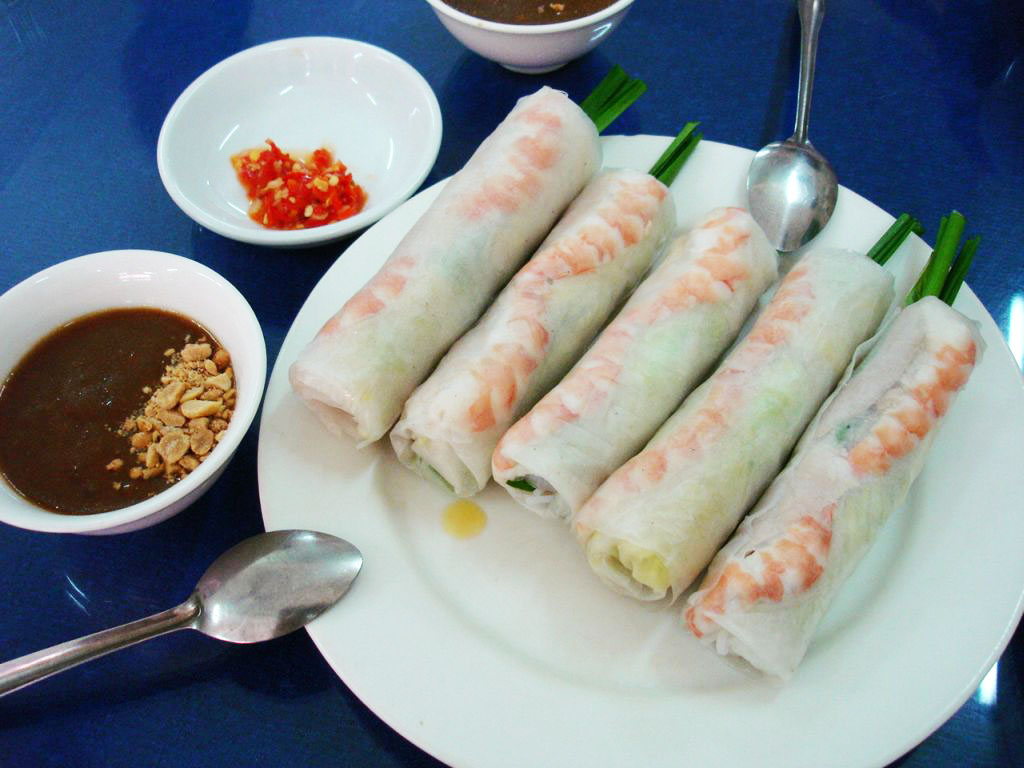
Bowl of tương (bottom left) in a serving of gỏi cuốn

Tương (Vietnamese: [tɨəŋ], chữ Hán: 醬) is the name applied to a variety of condiments, a kind of fermented bean paste made from soybean and commonly used in Vietnamese cuisine.

Originally, the term tương refers to a salty paste made from fermented soybeans, which is popular in vegetarian meals, particularly those prepared and eaten by Vietnamese Buddhist monks. It is also the most typical dipping sauce for summer rolls (gỏi cuốn). The paste, which is generally dark brown in color, is produced by adding the fungus Aspergillus oryzae to roasted soybeans, which are then allowed to naturally ferment in a jar with water until it develops an umami flavor. Other ingredients, such as glutinous rice or maize powder, salt, or water, may also be used. Tương is similar to the Chinese yellow soybean paste, though the latter is generally saltier and thicker in texture.

Tương may range in consistency from a thick paste to a thin liquid. Some varieties, such as that prepared in Central Vietnam, are watery, with solids at the bottom of the container in which it is stored. A more condensed variety, called tương Bần or tương làng Bần, is produced in the town of Bần Yên Nhân, in Mỹ Hào district of Hưng Yên Province, in the Red River Delta of northern Vietnam, and takes its name from the name of the town. Other varieties of tương are similarly named for the towns or districts in which they are made, such as tương Phố Hiến (made in a township of Hưng Yên Province), tương Nam Đàn (made in a district of Nghệ An Province), tương Cự Đà (made in a town in Hà Tây Province) and tương chùa Mía (Đường Lâm village, Hà Tây Province). In Southern Vietnam, it is called tương hột.

Tương is commercially available in glass and plastic jars and bottles throughout Vietnam, as well as in Vietnamese grocery stores overseas.

The word tương can also be used to refer to other condiments, such as tương cà (tomato sauce), tương xí muội (plum sauce) or tương ớt (chilli sauce). In southern Vietnam, nước tương refers to soy sauce while northern Vietnam calls it xì dầu.

== Varieties ==
=== Tương đen (or tương ngọt, or Hoisin sauce) ===
- Phở
- Gỏi cuốn: a variation of tương đen is used. This variation is called tương xào.
- Bò bía: uses tương xào.
- Chạo tôm: a variation of tương đen is used. This variation is called tương kho.
- Nem nướng: uses tương kho.
- Bánh ướt thịt nướng: uses tương kho.
- Cuốn tôm chua: a variation of tương đen is used. This variation is called tương ruốc.

=== Tương ớt ===
Sauce with chilli and garlic.

- Sriracha sauce

=== Tương Bần and tương Cự Đà ===
- Boiled water spinach.
- Bánh đúc lạc: a kind of bánh đúc
- Bê thui: a kind of grilled beef.

=== Tương Nam Đàn ===
- Bánh khoái, a pancake which is similar to bánh xèo.

== Etymology ==
The word tương derives from the Chinese word jiàng (Chữ Hán: 醬), meaning "paste."

== See also ==
- Cuisine of Vietnam
- Fermented bean paste
- List of fermented soy products
