= Thua nao =

Traditional Shan food made from fermented soybeans

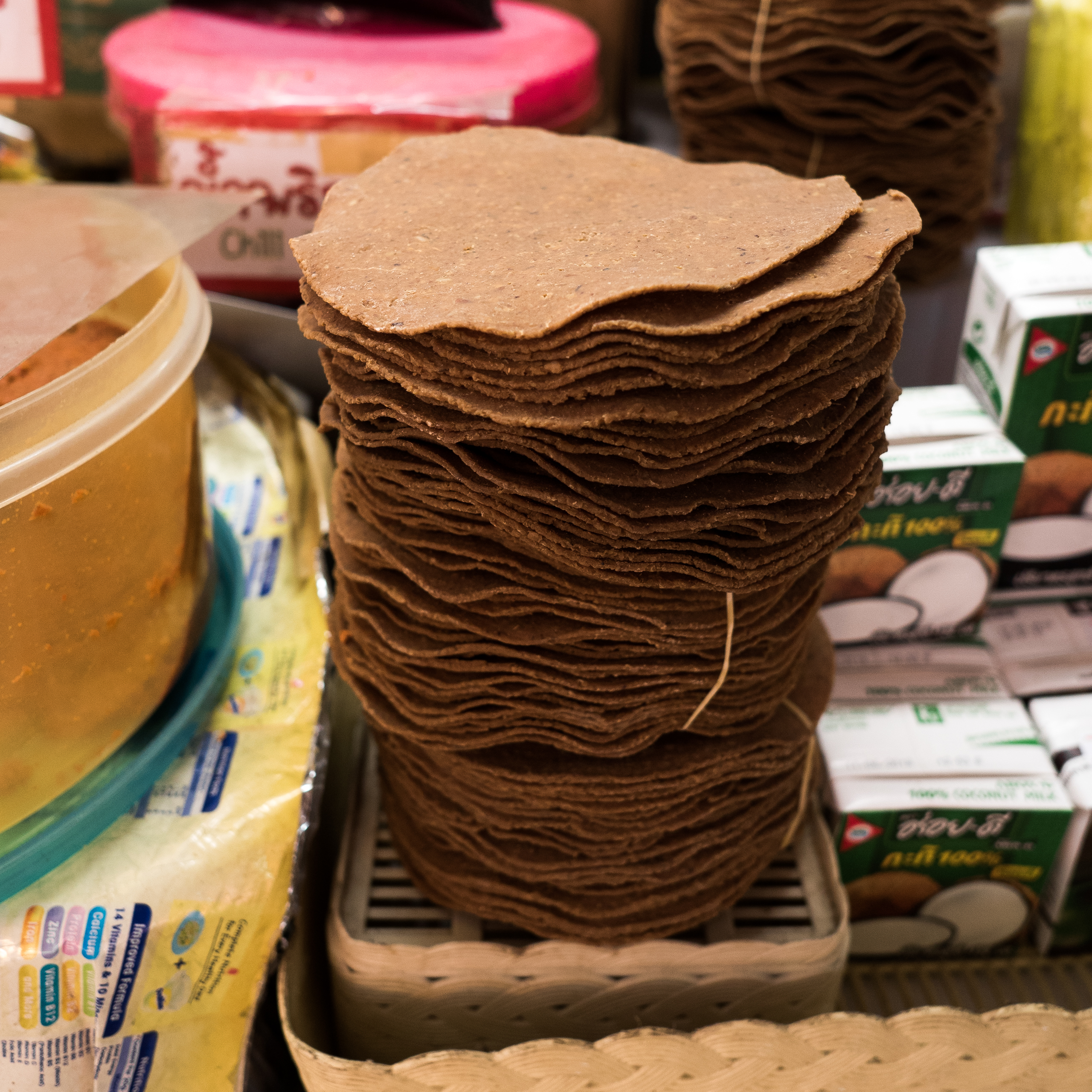
- Thua nao in the form of dried disks
- Alternative names: Pè bok
- Place of origin: Myanmar
- Region or state: Shan State
- Associated cuisine: Burmese and Thai cuisine
- Created by: Shan people
- Main ingredients: Soybeans
- Similar dishes: Other fermented soy products

Thua nao (Shan: ထူဝ်ႇၼဝ်ႈ; Thai: ถั่วเน่า; lit. 'rotten beans'), also known as pè bok (Burmese: ပဲပုပ်; lit. 'rotten beans'), is a fermented soybean product used in Burmese and Thai cuisine, particularly by the Shan, Tai Lue, and Northern Thai peoples as a cooking ingredient or condiment. Thua nao is created by fermenting cooked soybeans with naturally occurring microbes.

== Fermentation ==
In the fermentation process, soybeans are cleaned, washed, and soaked overnight. The soybeans are then boiled until they are soft, and then transferred to a bamboo basket and wrapped with banana leaves, enabling spontaneous fermentation to occur. Thua nao is fermented using an alkaline fermentation process, using Bacillus microbes.

== Uses and forms ==
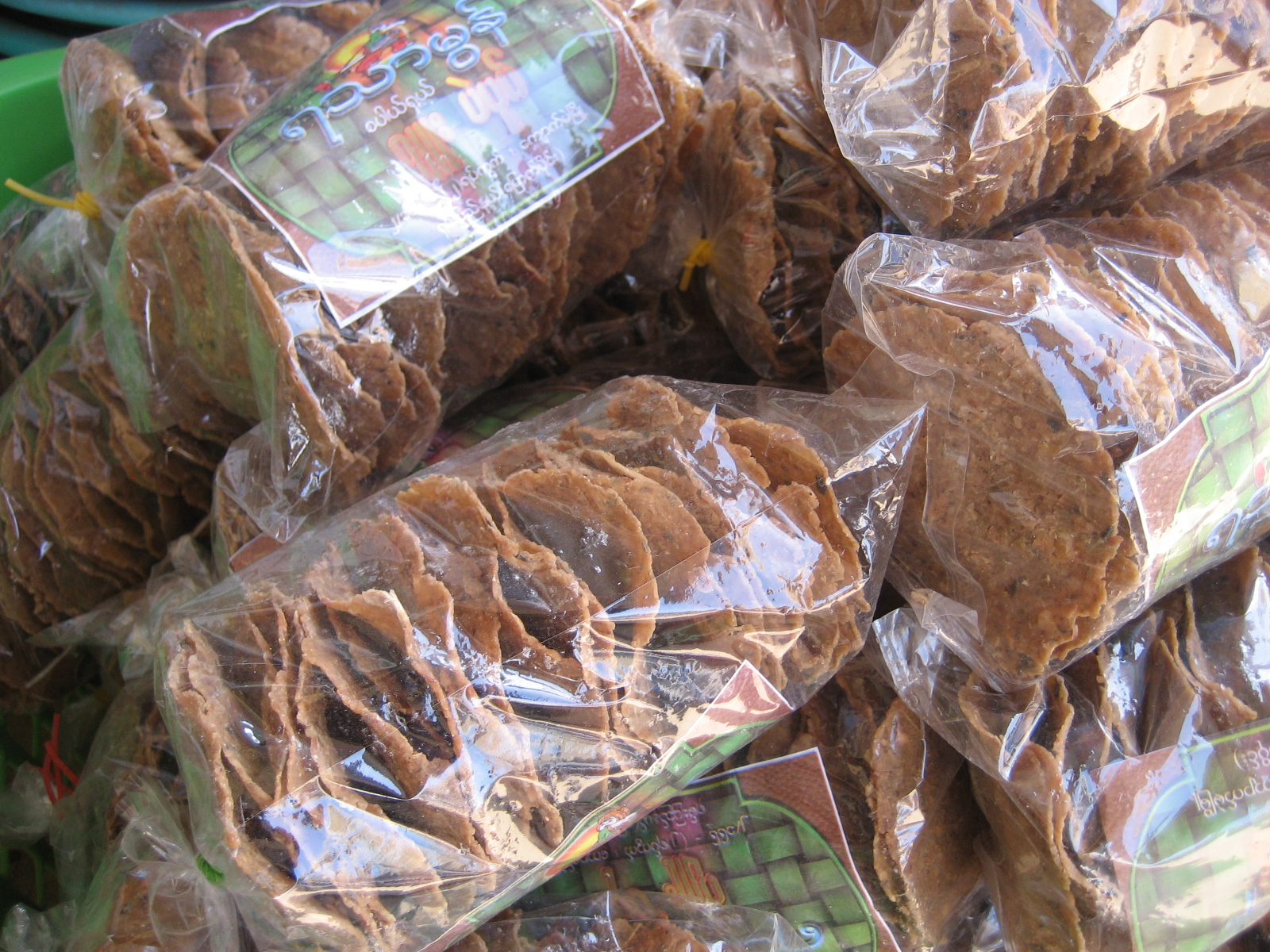
Packed pè bok bya from Kyaukme, Shan State in Myanmar

Thua nao is either cooked by steaming or roasting, or is further post-processed. It is commonly used as a protein substitute. Thua nao comes in two primary forms: fresh and dried. The wet, fresh form, called pè ngapi (ပဲငါးပိ; lit. 'bean ngapi') in Burmese, has a short shelf life.

The dried form is typically sold in the form of sun-dried flat disks, called thua nao khaep (ထူဝ်ႇၼဝ်ႈၶႅပ်, ถั่วเน่าแข็บ) or pè bok bya (ပဲပုပ်ပြား). The dried disks are roasted and eaten on their own, or ground into a powder and mixed with salads.

Thua nao is commonly used in Shan, Tai Lue, and Northern Thai cuisine, similar to how ngapi and shrimp paste are used in Burmese and central Thai cuisine. Thua nao moe (ถั่วเน่าเมอะ) is a Northern Thai dish consisting of fermented beans that are wrapped in banana leaves and grilled or steamed, before being stir-fried or mixed with a chili dip. In Burmese cuisine, dried thua nao is fried and eaten as a condiment, used as a dry relish that includes oil, fried onions, and garlic, or tossed into a salad with onions and chilies. It is also used to thicken soups and add umami to vegetarian dishes.

== In popular culture ==
- Sai Hsai Mao's "Me, the Little Shan Pè Bok" (ရှမ်းပဲပုပ်လေးကျွန်တော်) is a classic Burmese song.

== See also ==
- Fermented bean paste – Fermented foods made from ground soybeans
- List of fermented soy products
