= Zhajiangmian =

Chinese noodle dish

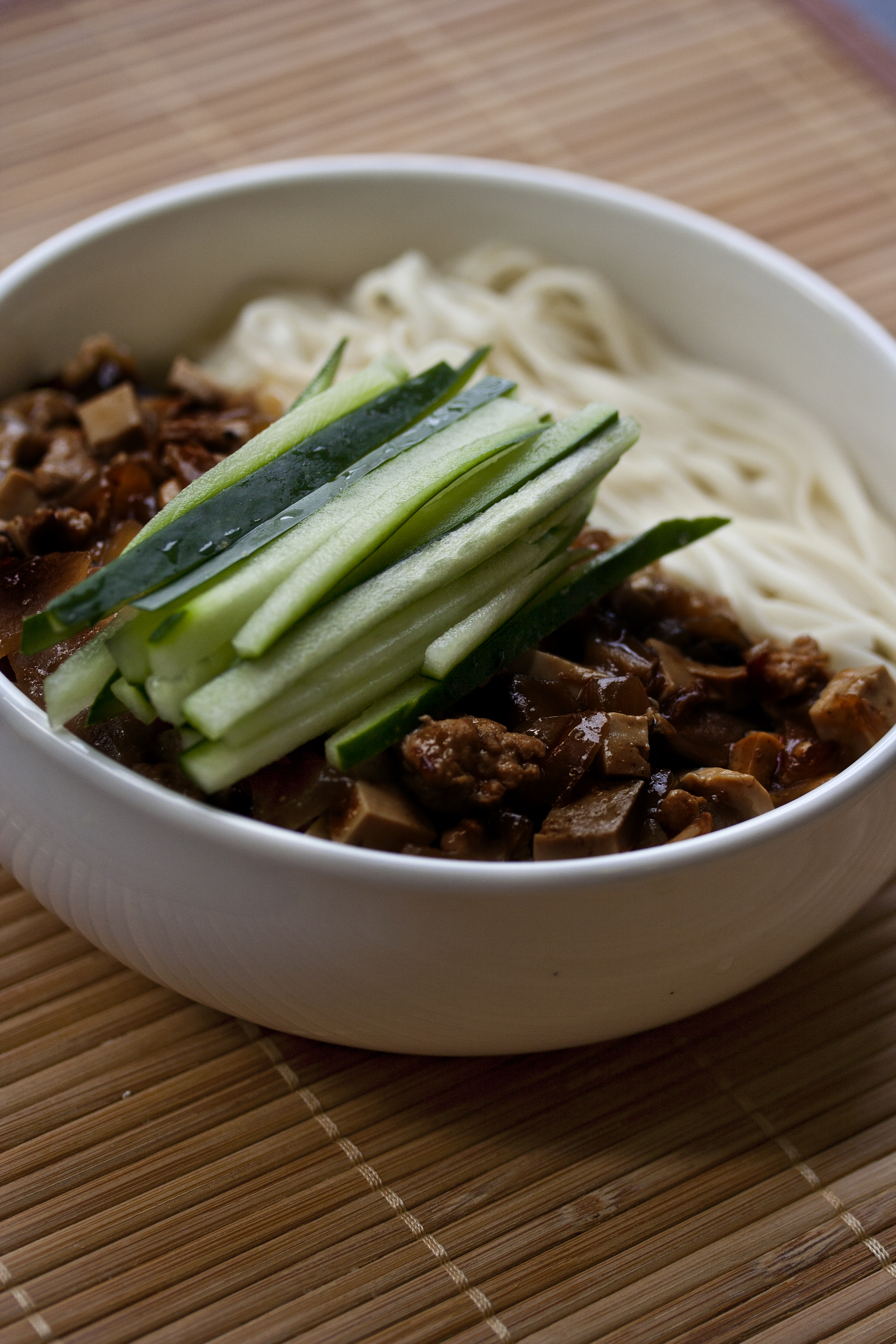
- A bowl of zhajiangmian garnished with cucumber
- Alternative names: Noodles with soybean paste, noodles with fried bean sauce
- Type: Chinese noodles, banmian
- Place of origin: Shandong, China
- Main ingredients: Cumian, pork, fermented soybean paste

Zhajiangmian

Chinese name
- Simplified Chinese: 炸酱面
- Traditional Chinese: 炸醬麵
- Hanyu Pinyin: zhájiàngmiàn
- Literal meaning: "fried sauce noodles"
Transcriptions
Standard Mandarin
- Hanyu Pinyin: zhájiàngmiàn
- Bopomofo: ㄓㄚˊ ㄐㄧㄤˋ ㄇㄧㄢˋ
- Wade–Giles: cha^{2}-chiang^{4}-mien^{4}
- Tongyong Pinyin: jhá-jiàng-miàn
- IPA: [ʈʂǎ.tɕjâŋ.mjɛ̂n]
Yue: Cantonese
- Yale Romanization: jajeungmihn
- Jyutping: zaa3 zoeng3 min6
- IPA: [tsa˧ tsœŋ˧ min˨]

Korean name
- Hangul: 작장면/자장몐

Japanese name
- Kanji: 炸醤麺
- Kana: ジャージャー麺/ジャージャーン麺

Zhajiangmian (Chinese: 炸醬麵; pinyin: zhájiàngmiàn), commonly translated as "noodles served with fried bean sauce", is a dish of Chinese origin consisting of thick wheat noodles topped with zhajiang, a fermented soybean-based sauce. Variations may include toppings of fresh or pickled vegetables, beans, meat, tofu, or egg.

Zhajiangmian originated in Shandong, China, and is a well-known dish known within and beyond China. The popular variation is Beijing zhajiangmian (北京炸醬麵), which is recognized as one of the Ten Great Noodles of China (中國十大麵條). Zhajiangmian has also been adapted into the cuisines of South Korea (as jajangmyeon), and Japan (as jajamen).

== History ==
The origin of zhajiangmian is widely attributed to northern China and sometimes specifically accredited to the coastal province of Shandong.

=== Theories of origin ===
There are several theories of zhajiangmian's origins, many of which revolve around Chinese monarchs. The veracity of these claims is tenuous as important inventions in Chinese history were frequently attributed to prominent leaders and figures of the time. One theory maintains that the earliest form of zhajiangmian was created during the late 16th century in Manchuria by Nurhaci, the Emperor Taizu of Qing. Sources claim that during the Jurchen unification, Nurhaci commanded his troops to "supplant rations with jiang" (以醬代菜) by dissolving solid slabs of fermented soybean (醬坯) in water, creating a protein- and sodium-rich paste, and consuming it as a dip with vegetables.

Another theory suggests that zhajiangmian was discovered in Xi'an, Shaanxi and introduced to Beijing by the Empress Dowager Cixi. In 1900, forces of the Eight-Nation Alliance invaded Beijing. The entire imperial court, including Empress Dowager Cixi and the Guangxu Emperor, fled Beijing and evacuated to Xi'an. The empress's retinues were wearied by the time they reached Nan Dajie (南大街) in Xi'an, where the imperial Grand Supervisor (大總管), Li Lianying, discovered a noodle restaurant by its appetizing aroma. The empress dowager and emperor dined at the restaurant, each partaking of a bowl of vegetarian zhajiangmian. Cixi was so impressed by the dish that on their return to Beijing, she ordered that the noodle chef join her court.

Analysis of the subjective factors such as Beijing city development in Qing and Ming dynasties, food supply, climate, people's living conditions comes to a conclusion that Bean Paste Noodles and Old Beijing Noodles with Fried Bean Sauce occurred at the same time. The symbolic sign "Old Beijing Noodles with Fried Bean Sauce" is hidden but rich in profound cultural connotation.

== Types ==
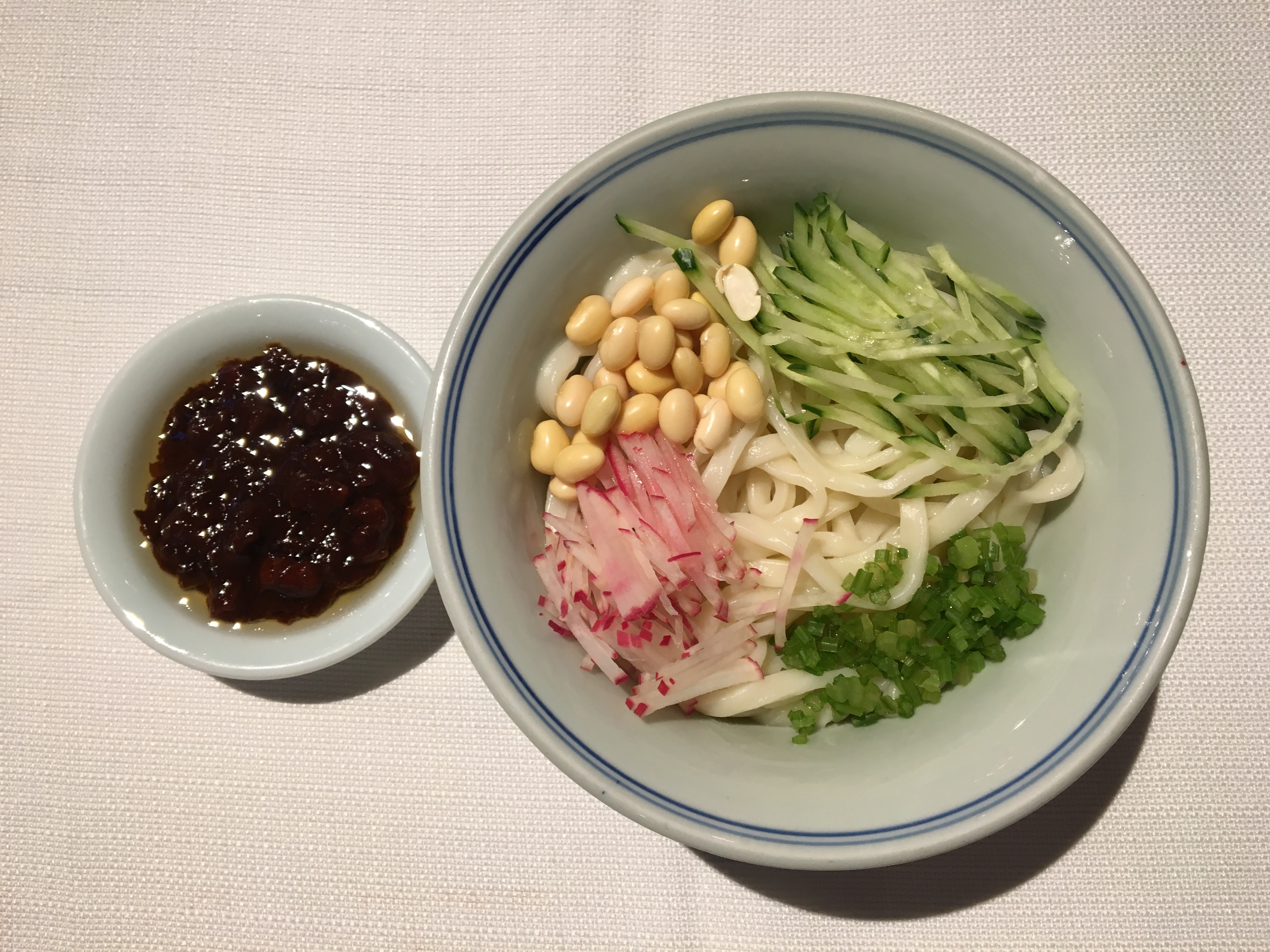
Zhajiangmian served in Beijing

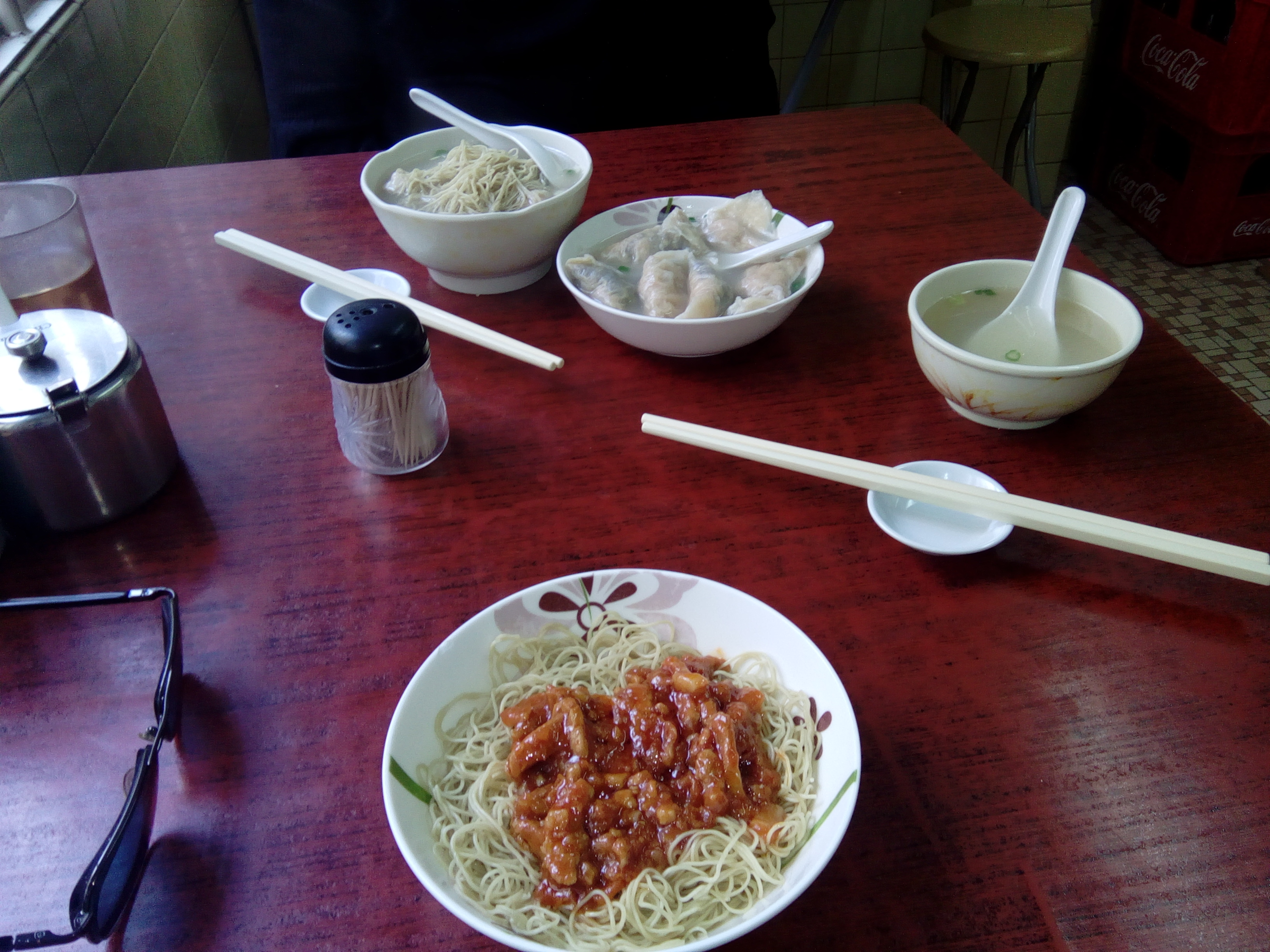
Zhajiangmian and wonton noodles served in Yuen Long, Hong Kong

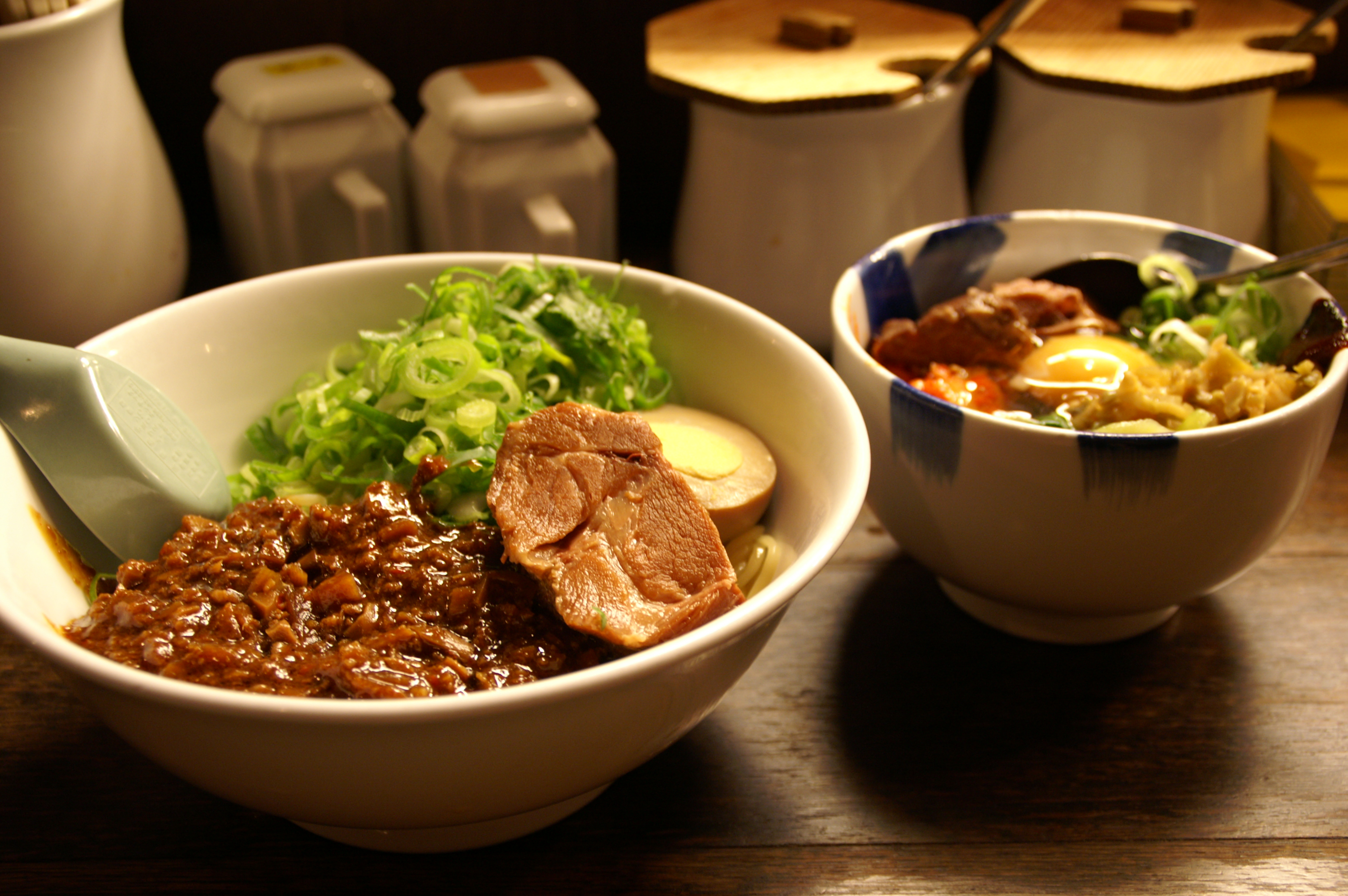
Zhajiangmian and donburi served in Japan

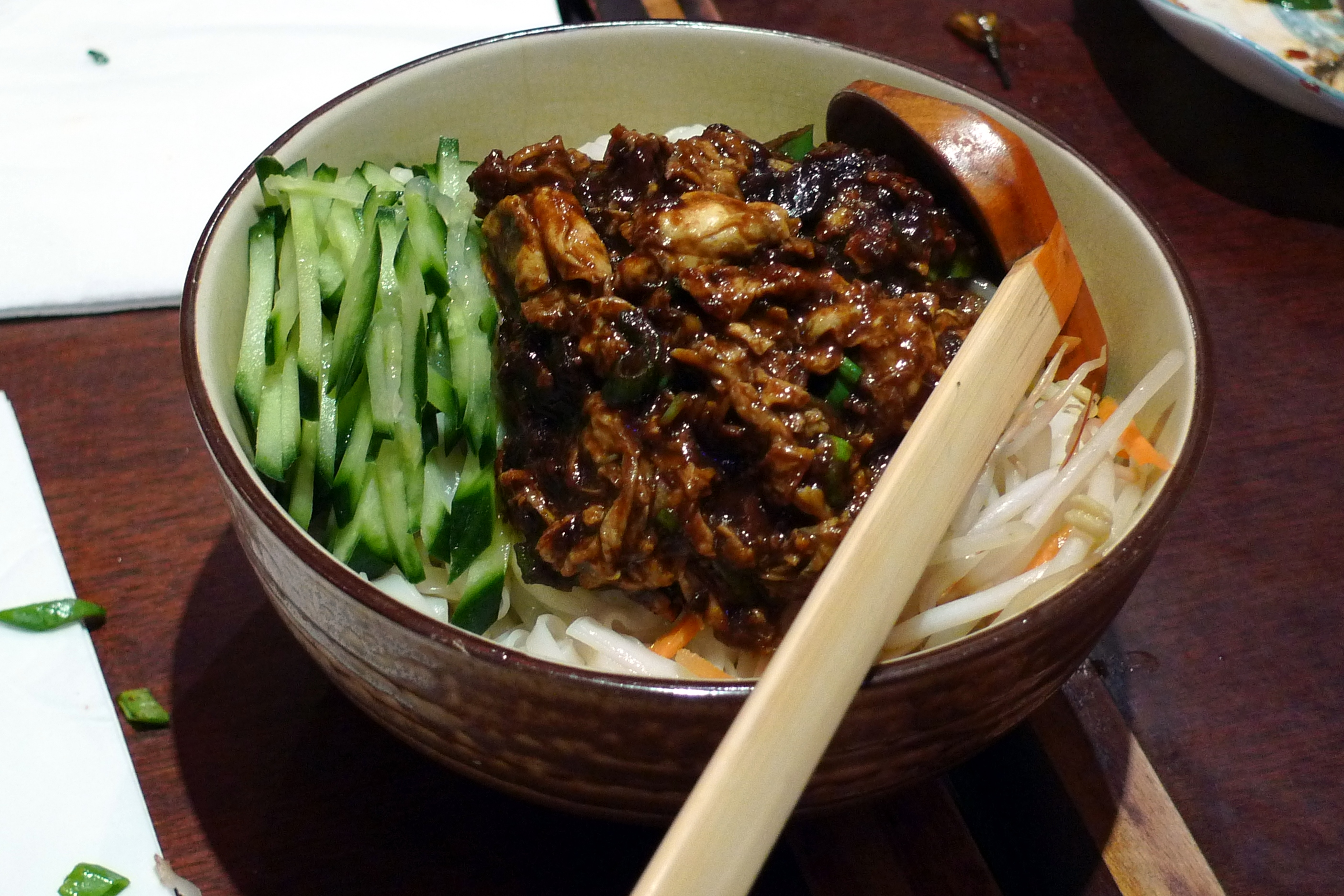
Zhajiangmian served in London, UK

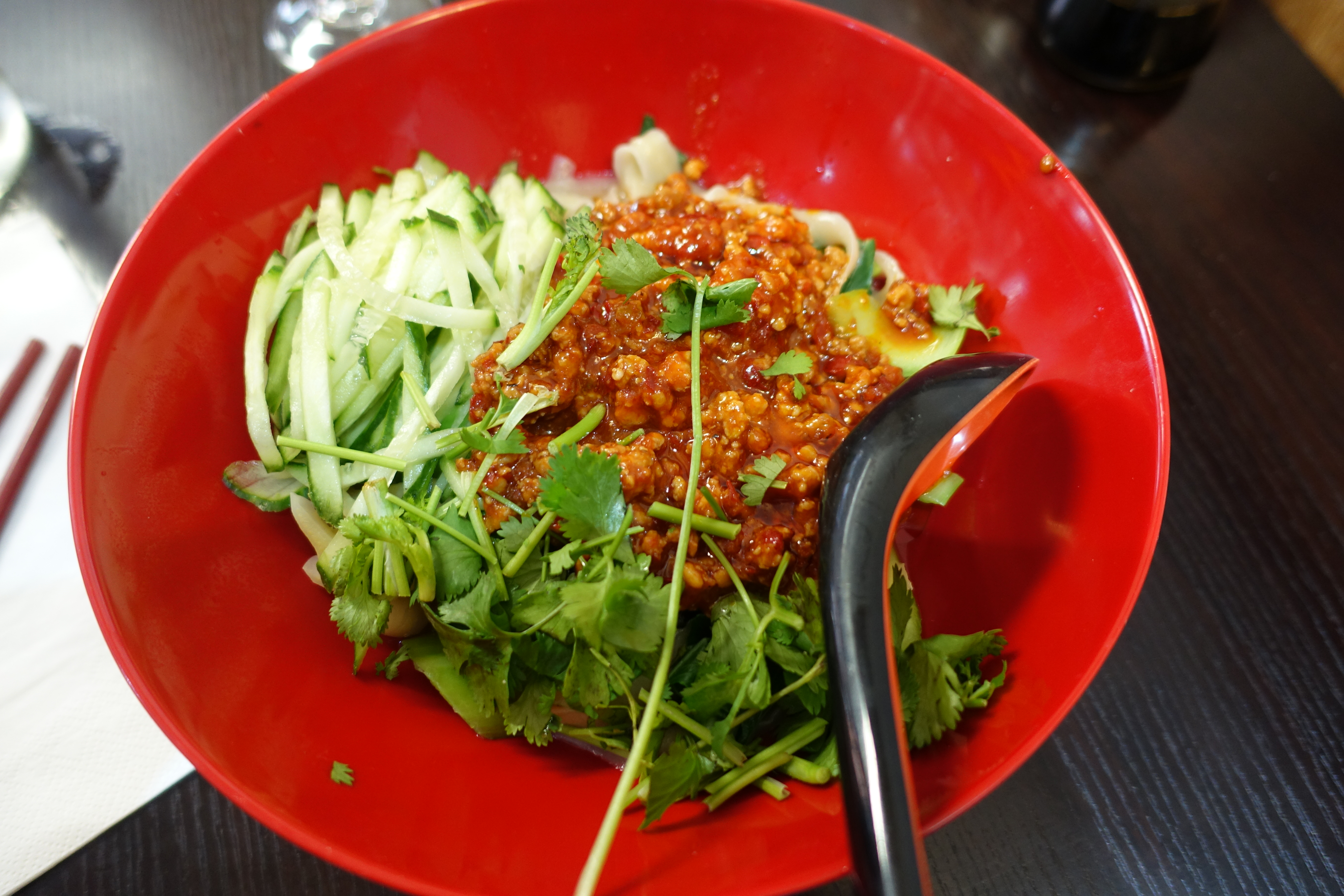
Zhajiangmian served in Paris, France

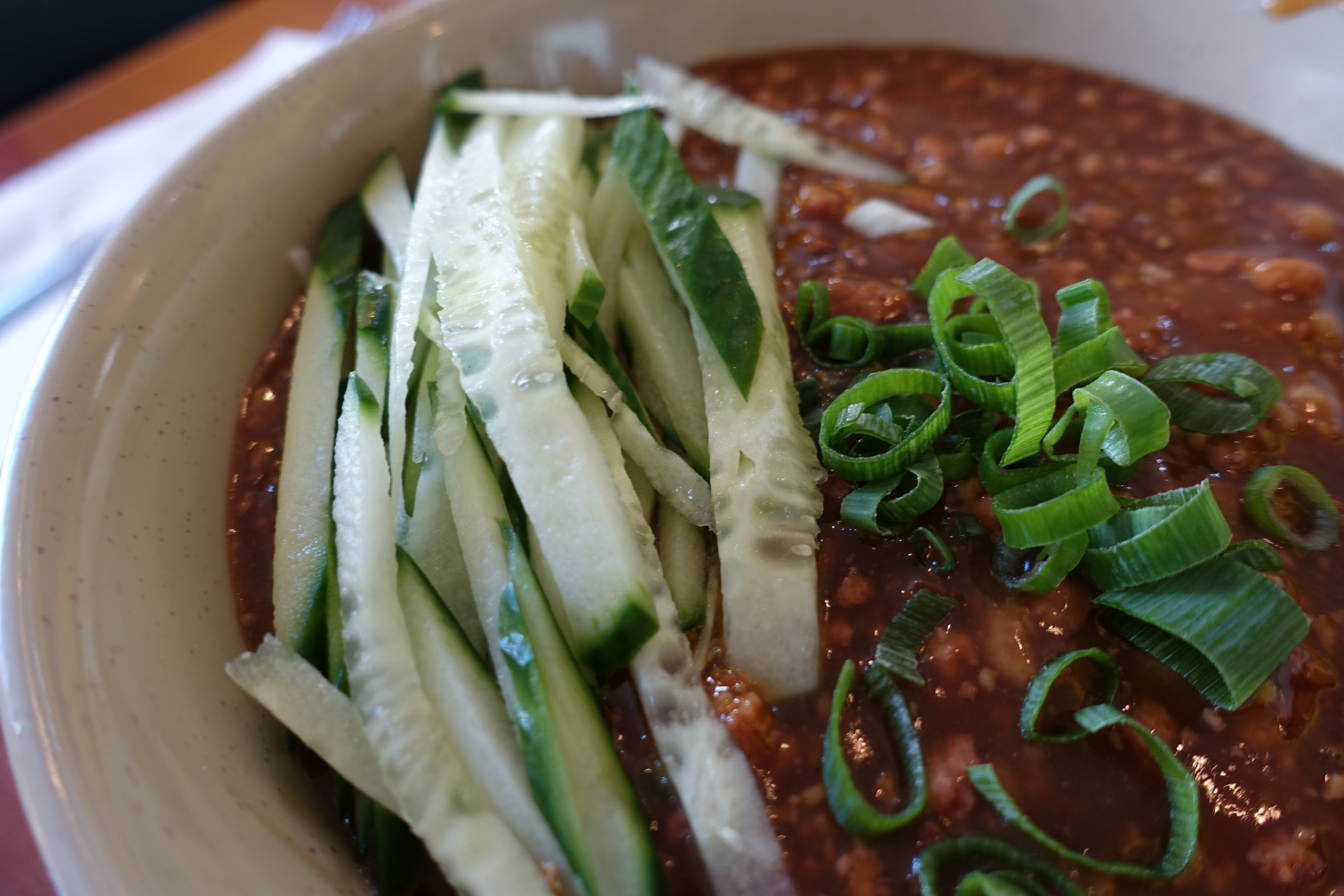
Zhajiangmian served in Montreal, Canada

=== Shandong ===
In Shandong cuisine, the sauce is made with tianmianjiang and this version of zhajiangmian is commonly viewed as the standard within China.

=== Beijing ===
In Beijing cuisine, yellow soybean paste and tianmianjiang are combined to make the sauce. During the process of frying the sauce, a large amount of white scallion is added, and diced pork is used instead of ground meat. Typically the dish is served with a variety of crunchy vegetables, such as cucumber, radish, roseheart radish, bean sprouts, celery, and soybeans. Thick handmade noodles are preferred. In China, Beijing-style zhajiangmian is the most well-known version, even over the original Shandong zhajiangmian.

=== Sichuan ===
In Sichuan cuisine, zajiangmian (雜醬麵) is considered its own version of zhajiangmian. Despite the similarity in name and contents, there is actually no clear evidence that zajiangmian originates from zhajiangmian. Ground meat is used instead of diced meat. Doubanjiang is also added to the sauce. This results in the zajiang meat sauce being more watery than zhajiang sauce, and the dish is less salty. Boiled, leafy vegetables are served with the noodles. Zajiangmian is typically served in soup, but there is also a version that is mixed directly with the sauce. Chili oil and chopped green onion are usually added as toppings.

=== Northeast China ===
In Liaoning and Jilin, the zhajiang sauce is traditionally fried with dajiang sauce. Ground meat is commonly used. Northeast zhajiang sauce also has two special variations, egg zhajiang and egg and green chili zhajiang, which contain no meat.

=== Cantonese ===
In Cantonese cuisine, especially Hong Kong cuisine, ketchup and chili sauce are added to the base zhajiang sauce for a slightly sweet, spicy, and sour flavor.

=== Buddhist ===
A vegetarian version of zhajiang sauce may be made by substituting ground beef or pork with finely diced extra firm smoked tofu (熏豆腐乾), edamame (毛豆), eggplant, or extra-firm tofu (素雞). The vegetarian versions generally call for soybean paste of any sort instead of soy sauce, since the tofu chunks are larger and need more structure.

=== Islamic ===
A halal version is often made with ground beef or lamb.

=== South Korea ===
In South Korea, zhajiangmian has evolved into jajangmyeon when workers from Shandong were sent by the Chinese military to Korea.

=== Taiwan ===
Instant noodle zhajiangmian brand Wei Lih Men in Taiwan

In Taiwan, zhajiangmian is served with a special Taiwanese-style sauce, prepared by cutting pork belly (五花肉) into small square pieces and mixing it with doubanjiang (豆瓣醬) and tianmian sauce (甜麵醬) diluted with water. This combination is then stir-fried with ginger and dougan (豆乾). The Taiwanese version is thus "lighter", with less oil and without the dark sauce. In different parts of Taiwan, there is also a combination of thin noodles, home-rolled noodles and instant noodles. One well-known product derived from zhajiangmian is the instant noodle brand Wei Lih Men (維力炸醬麵), which has been popular with Taiwanese people since its release in 1973.

=== Japan ===
In Japan, zhajiangmian evolved into jajamen (じゃじゃ麺) when it was brought from Northeast China. It is a popular dish in the northern Japanese city of Morioka, Iwate and is known as one of the three great noodle dishes of Morioka (盛岡三大麺).

== Preparation ==
Zhajiang sauce is normally made by simmering stir-fried diced ground pork or beef with salted fermented soybean paste. Low-fat dieters often use minced skinless chicken for the meat portion.

Then, it is added onto boiled noodles.

The topping of the noodles usually are sliced vegetables, including cucumber, radish, and pickled edamame, depending on the region. Chopped omelette or in lieu of extra firm tofu can also be alongside. See also

- Banmian
- Chinese noodles
- List of Chinese dishes
- Jajangmyeon
- Jajamen
