= Yellow soybean paste =

Chinese fermented soybean paste

- Traditional Chinese: 黃豆醬
- Simplified Chinese: 黄豆酱
- Literal meaning: yellow soybean paste
Transcriptions
Standard Mandarin
- Hanyu Pinyin: huángjiàng
Yue: Cantonese
- Jyutping: wong4 zoeng3

Yellow soybean paste is a fermented paste made from yellow soybeans, salt, and water. Yellow soybean paste is produced in China and is used primarily in Beijing cuisine and other cuisines of northern China.

== Etymology ==
In Chinese, the full name of the condiment is huángdòu jiàng (黃豆醬; 'yellow bean paste'), but it is commonly referred to as just huáng jiàng ("yellow paste").

== Description ==
Although it is made from yellow soybeans, the paste itself is not so much yellow as light to dark brown or even black in color.

Wheat flour, though not formerly used, is often used as an additional ingredient in the modern day, and potassium sorbate may be used as a preservative.

== Usage ==
Yellow soybean paste is used most notably in the noodle dish called zhajiang mian ("fried sauce noodles"), in which the yellow soybean paste is fried together with ground pork, then poured over the top of thick wheat flour noodles.

Outside of Beijing, sweet bean sauce or hoisin sauce is often mixed with or used in place of the condiment, thus giving the dish a sweeter taste.

== Availability ==
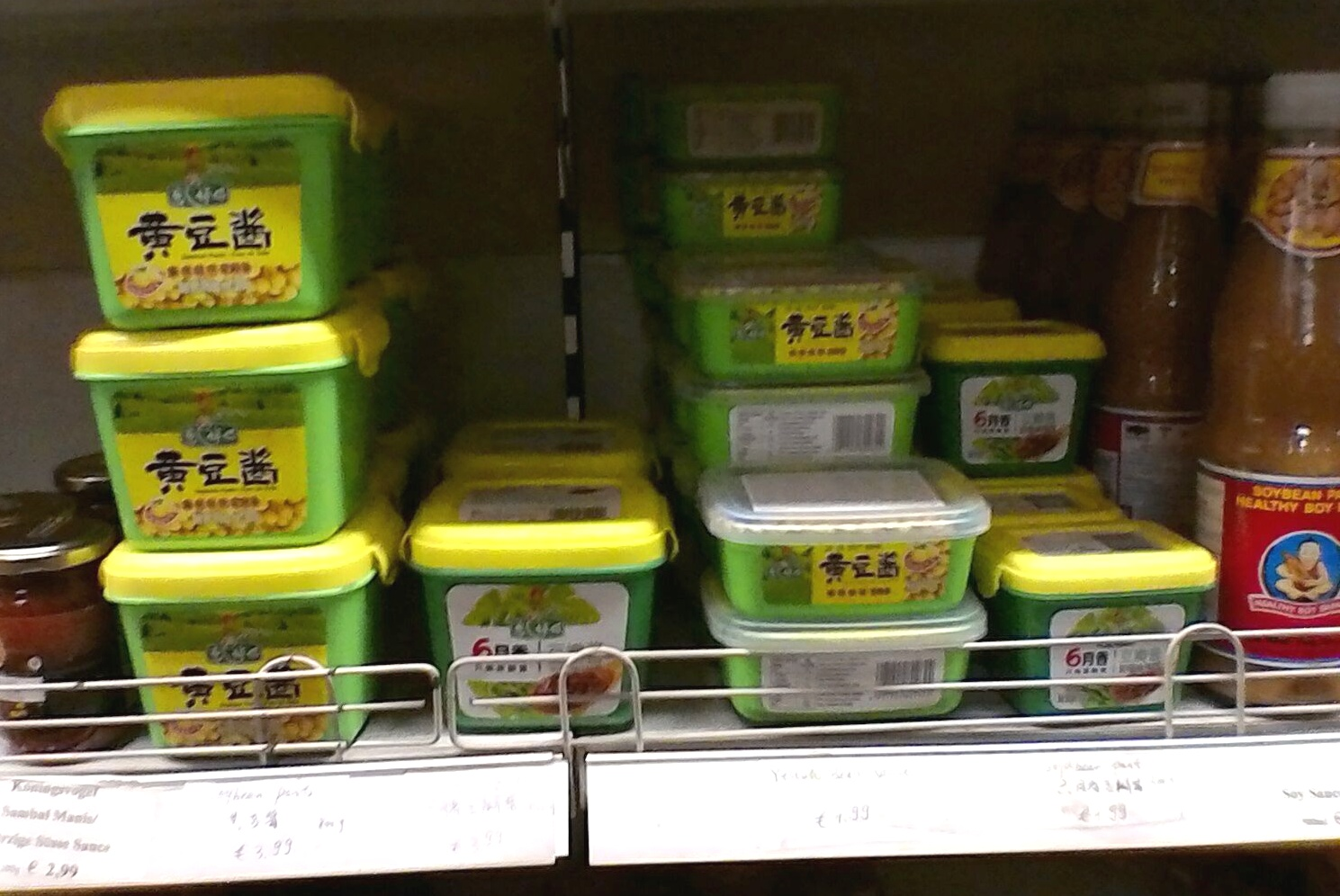
Huáng jiàng on a supermarket shelf

Yellow soybean paste is widely available in China, as well as in Chinese grocery stores overseas, and comes in plastic packages, bottled or in tins.

== Other varieties ==
In recent years, a new form of yellow soybean paste, called "dry yellow soybean paste" (干黄酱, pinyin: gān huángjiàng; or 干酱, pinyin: gān jiàng), has been developed, and is widely available in plastic packages. Its texture is drier than that of regular yellow soybean paste (due to its lower water content), allowing for easier transportation and keeping. Dry yellow soybean paste is used in a similar manner as regular yellow soybean paste, but, when using the dry form, water is first added to dilute it, and then it is added to the dish; if it is added directly to a dish, the amount of water added to the dish should be adjusted accordingly.

In Thai cuisine, a variant of yellow soybean paste, often mixed with chilies, is also popular.

== Technical process ==
There are different kinds of soybean sauce, i.e., the liquid state with high salt, solid with low salt and ferment of combination of liquid and solid according to its making process and high temperature fermentation, middle temperature fermentation and low temperature fermentation according to the temperature of the ferment.

== See also ==
- Doenjang (Korean-style soybean paste)
- Douchi
- List of fermented soy products
- Miso (Japanese-style soybean paste)
