= Tianmian sauce =

Sweet savory sauce in China and Korea

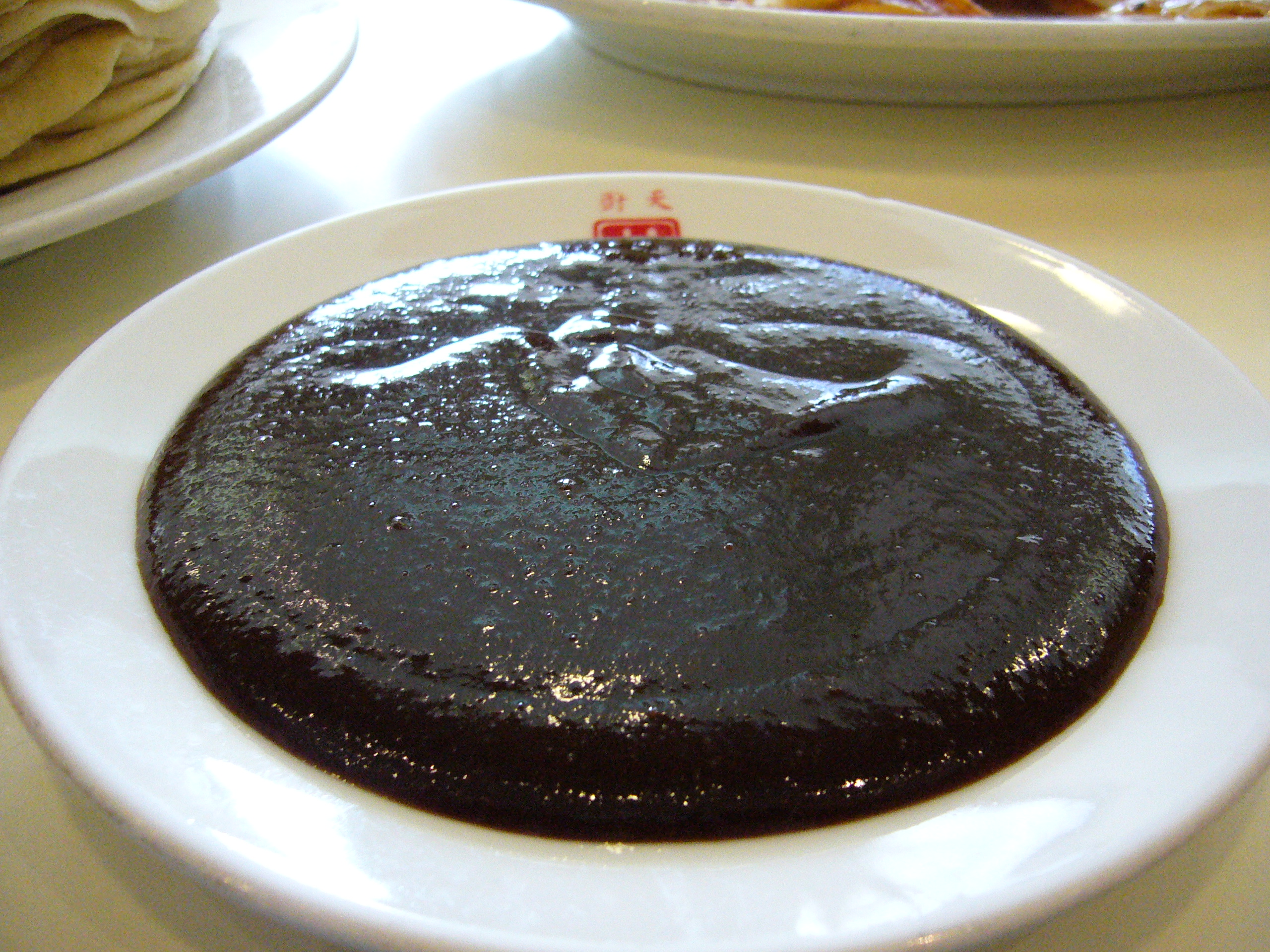
- A dish of tianmian sauce
- Alternative names: Sweet flour sauce
- Type: Sauce
- Place of origin: China
- Region or state: Northern and Northeastern China, South Korea
- Associated cuisine: Chinese cuisine Korean-Chinese cuisine
- Main ingredients: Flour, salt
- Ingredients generally used: Soybean

Regional names

Chinese name
- Simplified Chinese: 甜面酱 / 甜酱
- Traditional Chinese: 甜麵醬 / 甜醬
- Literal meaning: "sweet flour sauce" / "sweet sauce"
Transcriptions
Standard Mandarin
- Hanyu Pinyin: tián miàn jiàng / tián jiàng
- Wade–Giles: t'ien^{2} mien^{4} chiang^{4} / t'ien^{2} chiang^{4}
Yue: Cantonese
- Yale Romanization: tìhm mihn jeung / tìhm jeung
- Jyutping: tim^{4} min^{6} zoeng^{3} / tim^{4} zoeng^{3}

Korean name
- Hangul: 춘장
Transcriptions
- Revised Romanization: chunjang
- McCune–Reischauer: ch'unjang

Tianmian sauce (Chinese: 甜麵醬/甜醬; pinyin: tiánmiànjiàng; tiánjiàng), also known as sweet bean sauce, sweet flour sauce or sweet wheat paste, is a thick, smooth, dark brown or black paste with either a mild, savory or sweet flavor. It is commonly used in Northern Chinese cuisine, Northeastern Chinese cuisine, and Korean-Chinese cuisine. Peking duck and jajangmyeon are two popular dishes that feature the sauce.

== Etymology ==
The Chinese word tiánmiànjiàng (甜麵醬) consists of characters meaning "sweet" (甜), "flour" (麵), and "sauce" (醬). It is also called tiánjiàng (甜醬), which means "sweet sauce". The origin of the Korean word chunjang (춘장) is unknown. One theory is that it derived from the word cheomjang (첨장), which is the Korean reading of the Chinese characters 甛醬.

== Preparation ==
Although terms such as "sweet bean sauce" and "sweet bean paste" are used to describe the sauce, it is primarily made from fermented wheat flour. A mixture of approximately 95% of wheat flour to 5% of soybean is used. The fermentation starter is made from dried or stale mantou (a steamed bread), wrapped in a variety of true melon known as miangua and then bound and hung in a cool, dark place until completely dried. During the fermentation process, the glucose and maltose give the paste its distinctive sweet taste.

== Variations and uses ==
=== Chinese varieties ===
Similar to hoisin sauce, sweet bean sauce may be used in dishes. For example, Peking duck is often served wrapped with sweet bean sauce and various other toppings. It is also used as a sweeter substitute for saltier yellow soybean paste. In Northern China, the sauce is also eaten with raw scallions.

There are many different types of sweet bean sauces. Recipes and methods of production vary depending on the geographical region and on manufacturer preferences. In northern China, more sugar is added to the sauce. In southern China, mantou flour instead of sugar is commonly used as the main ingredient. Traditionally, high-quality sweet bean sauces owe their sweet flavor to the fermentation of starches rather than to the addition of refined sugar.

Sweet bean sauce can be found in standard Asian supermarkets under various English names. In Chinese, it is written 甜麵醬.

=== Korean chunjang ===
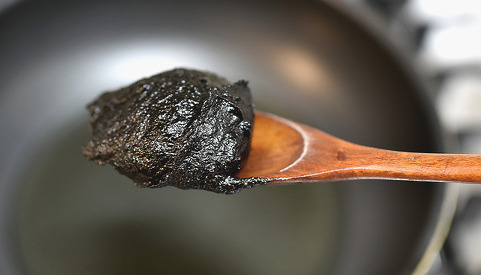
Chunjang

In Korea, chunjang (춘장) is most commonly used to make jajang (자장), a black gravy served with a popular noodle dish called jajangmyeon. Other common dishes with jajang sauce include jajang-bap ("rice with jajang sauce") and jajang-tteok-bokki (stir-fried rice cakes with jajang sauce). Although stir-frying chunjang to make jajang is the most common use for the sauce, chunjang may also be served as an accompaniment to sliced raw onions. In most Korean-Chinese restaurants, raw onions, chunjang, and danmuji (yellow pickled radish) are the basic side dishes.

Korean chunjang is similar to the Shandong-style tiánmiànjiàng, as it was first used in Incheon Chinatown, where the majority of restaurants were run by Chinese immigrants from Shandong. However, now most Korean-Chinese restaurants are run by Koreans, and chunjang has adapted to Korean tastes, as have other Korean-Chinese dishes and ingredients.

== Gallery ==
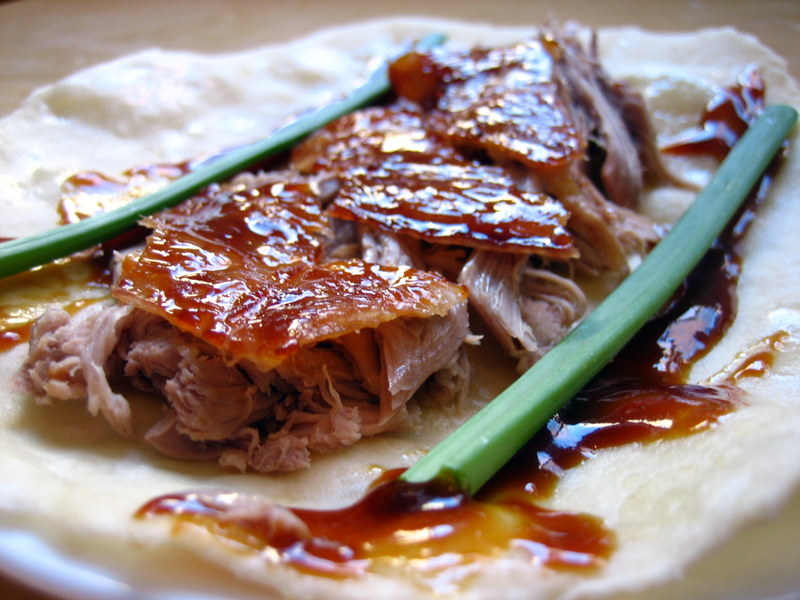
Peking duck

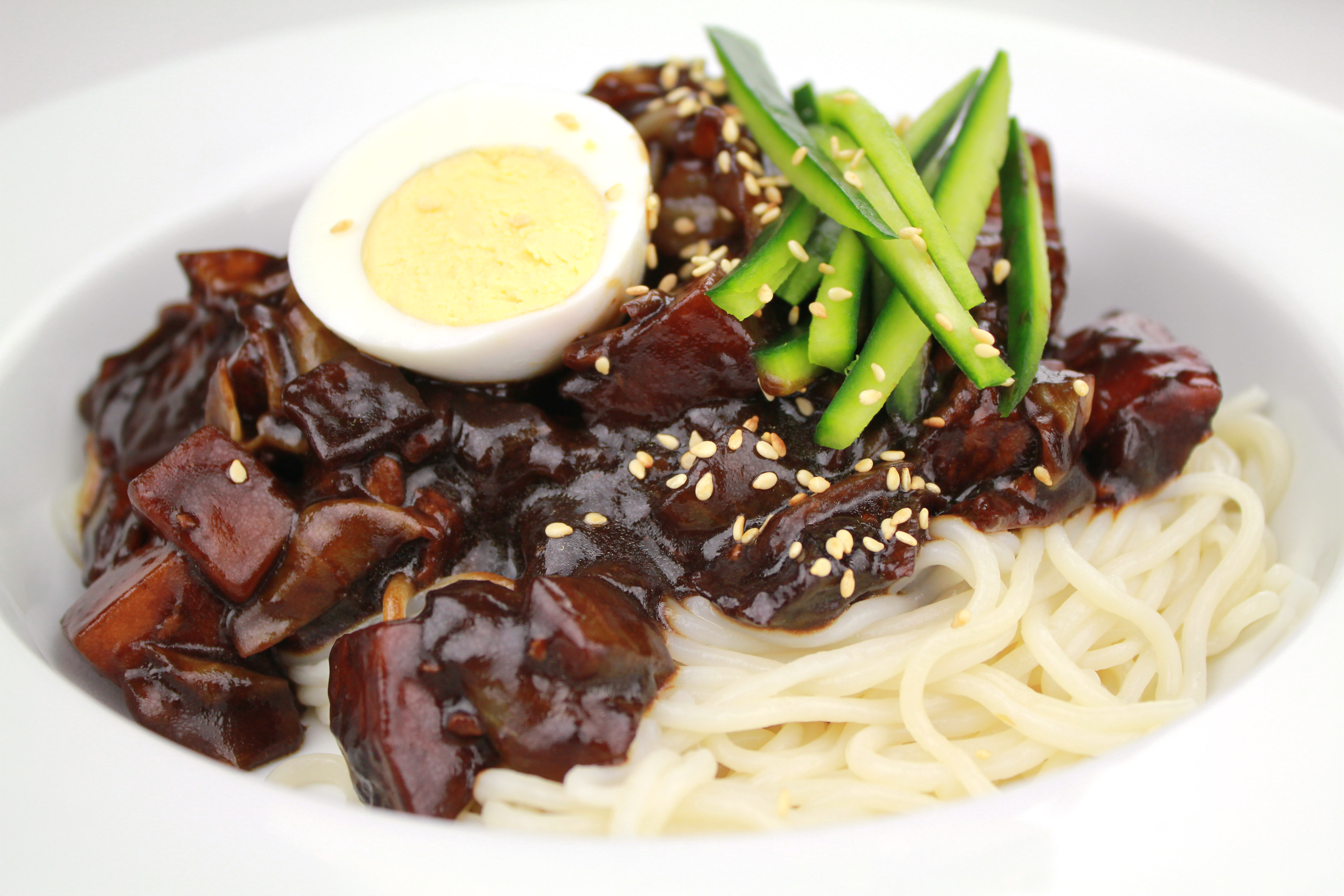
Jajangmyeon

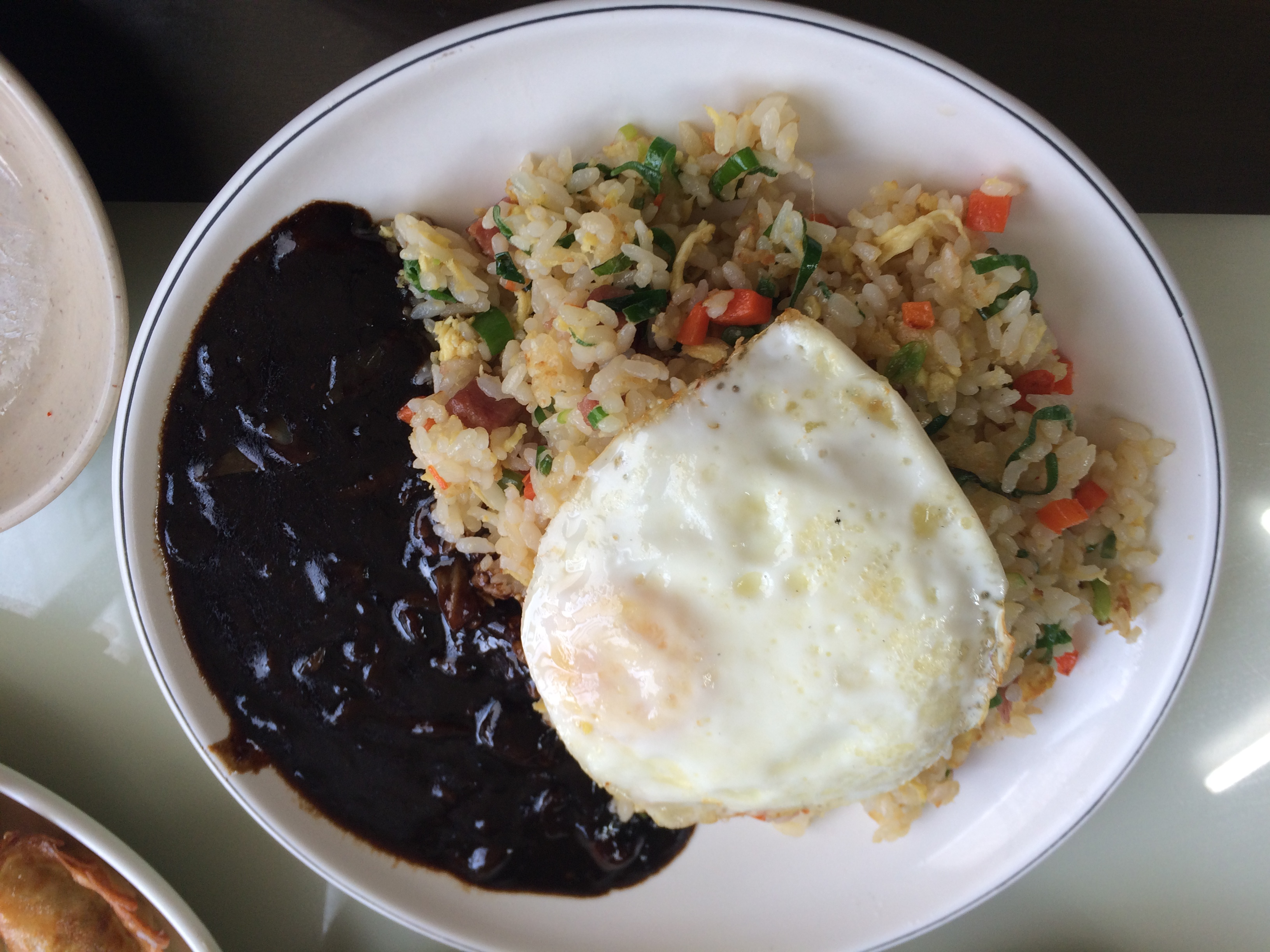
Korean-Chinese bokkeum-bap (fried rice)

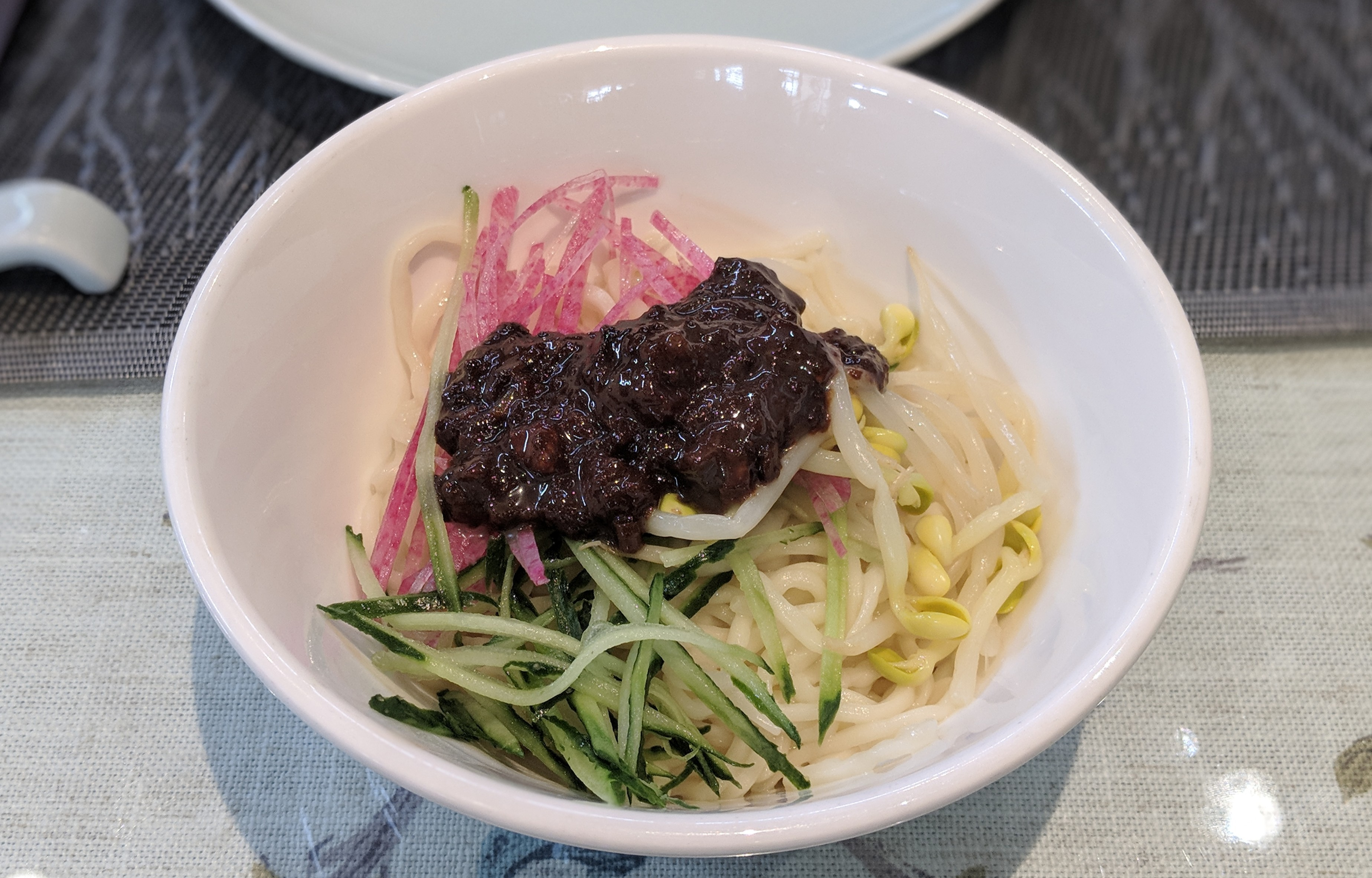
Zhajiangmian

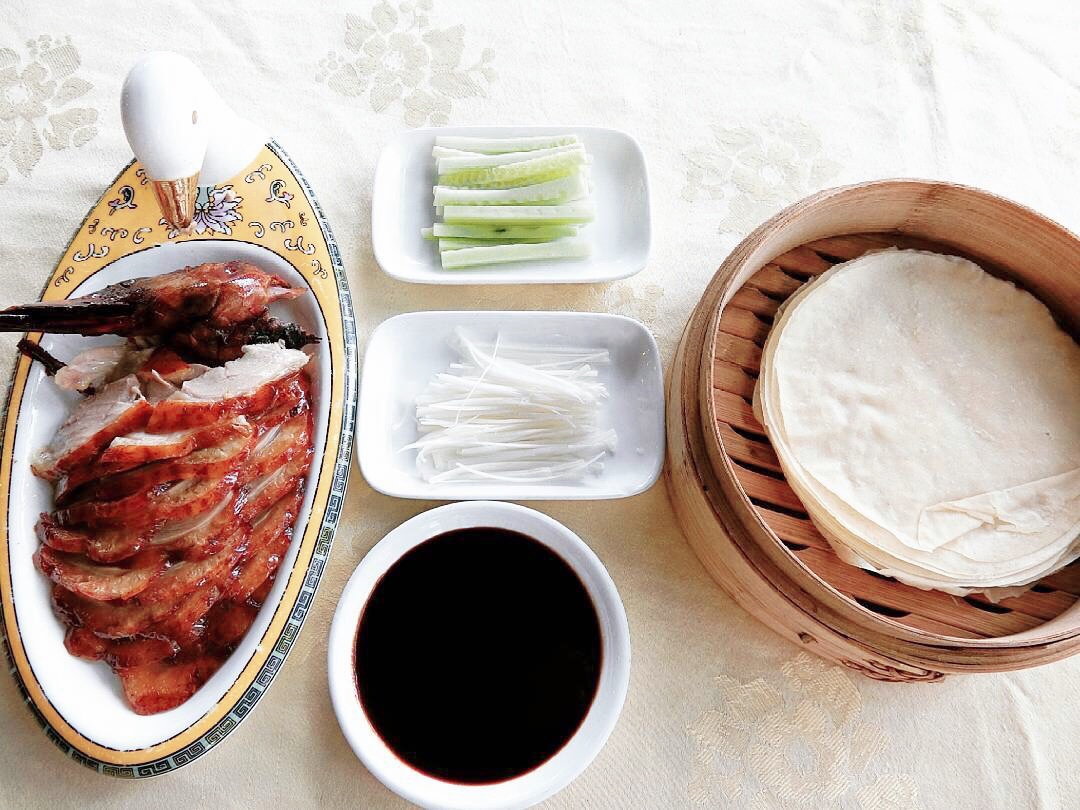
Peking duck

== See also ==
- Doubanjiang
- Hoisin sauce
- Jajangmyeon
- Peking duck
- Tamari
- Teriyaki
- Zhajiangmian
- List of Chinese sauces
- List of condiments
- List of fermented soy products
