= Jjajangmyeon =

Korean Chinese noodle dish

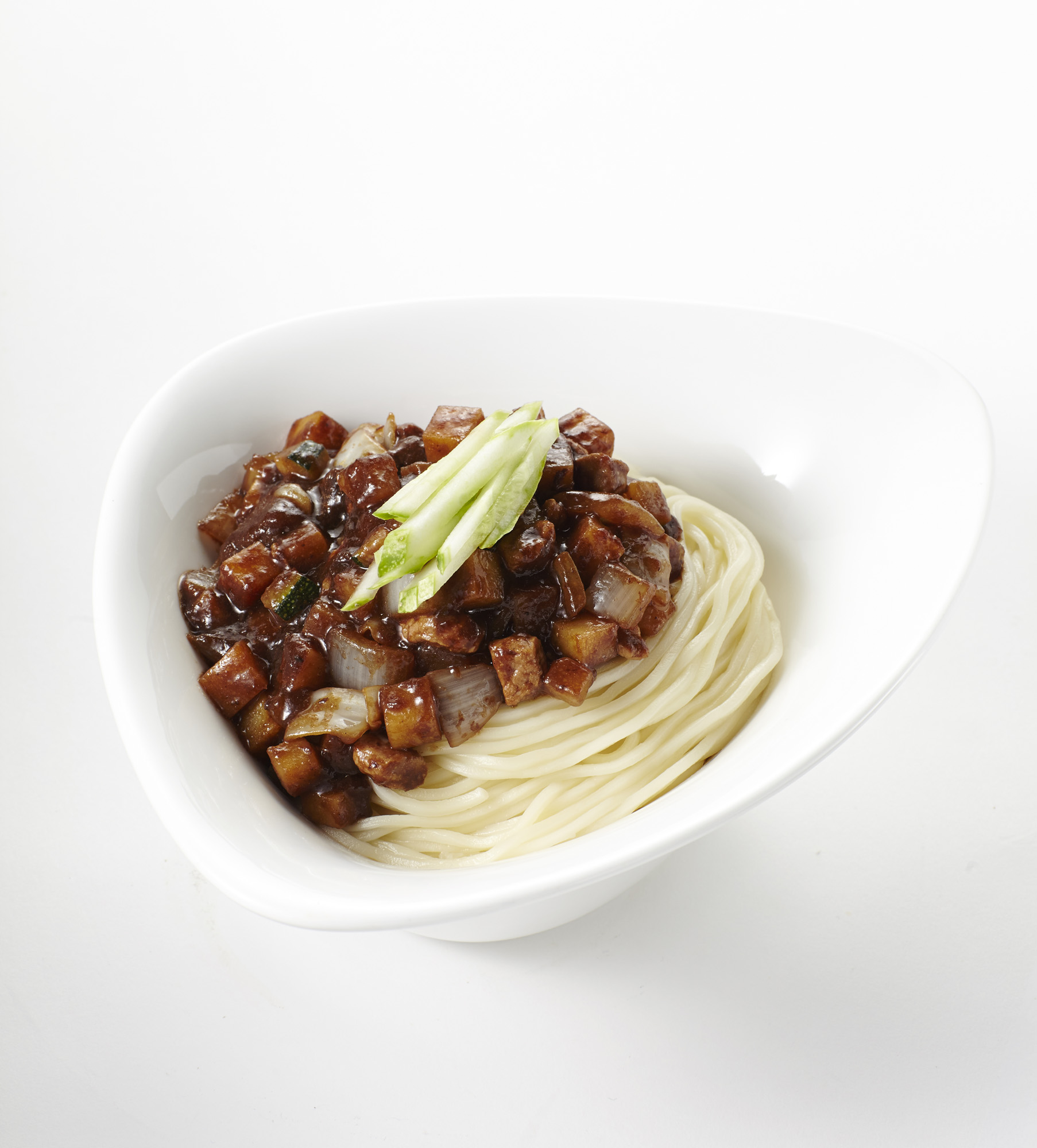
- Alternative names: Jajangmyeon
- Type: Korean Chinese cuisine, Myeon
- Place of origin: China (original); Korea (introduced)
- Region or state: East Asia
- Main ingredients: cumian, chunjang, meat, vegetables, sometimes seafood

Korean name
- Hangul: 자장면; 짜장면
- Hanja: 자장麵; 짜장麵
- RR: jajangmyeon; jjajangmyeon
- MR: chajangmyŏn; tchajangmyŏn
- IPA: [tɕa.dʑaŋ.mjʌn]; [t͈ɕa.dʑaŋ.mjʌn]

Jjajangmyeon (Korean: 짜장면) or Jajangmyeon (자장면) is a Korean Chinese noodle dish topped with a thick sauce made of chunjang, diced pork, and vegetables. It is a variation of the Chinese dish zhajiangmian; it developed in the late 19th century, during the Joseon period, when Chinese migrant workers from Shandong arrived in Incheon. The Korean variant of the dish uses a darker and sweeter sauce than the Chinese version. Variants of the dish use seafood, or other meats.

== Name ==
Jjajang or jajang is borrowed from the Chinese word zhájiàng (炸醬), which means "fried sauce", while myeon (면; 麵) means "noodles", itself a Sino-Korean loanword in place of the native guksu (국수). The Chinese characters are pronounced jakjang (작장) in Korean, but the noodle dish is called jajangmyeon, not *jakjangmyeon, because its origin is not the Sino-Korean word, but a transliteration of the Chinese pronunciation. As the Chinese pronunciation of zhá sounded like jja (rather than ja) to Korean ears, the dish is known in South Korea as jjajangmyeon, and the vast majority of Korean Chinese restaurants use this spelling.

For many years, until 22 August 2011, the National Institute of Korean Language did not recognize the word jjajangmyeon as an accepted idiomatic transliteration. Jjajangmyeon did not become the standard spelling because the transliteration rules for foreign words announced in 1986 by the Ministry of Education stated that the foreign obstruents should not be transliterated using doubled consonants except for some established usages. The lack of acknowledgment faced tough criticism from the supporters of the spelling jjajangmyeon, such as Ahn Do-hyeon, a Sowol Poetry Prize winning poet. Later, jjajangmyeon was accepted as an alternative standard spelling alongside jajangmyeon in the National Language Deliberation Council and, on 31 August 2011, included as a standard spelling in the Standard Korean Language Dictionary.

== History ==
Jajangmyeon was brought to Incheon, Korea during the late nineteenth century by migrant workers from Shandong province, China. At a time when both Qing and Japanese businesses were competing against each other, jajangmyeon was offered at the Chinese restaurant Gonghwachun in Incheon Chinatown, which was founded in 1905 and run by an immigrant from the Shandong region. The building which the restaurant formerly occupied now houses the Jajangmyeon Museum, which opened in April 2012.

Both the name and dish originate from the Chinese dish zhájiàngmiàn (炸醬麵). The common copied features of both are pork, long wheat noodles, and a sauce made from fermented soybean paste. Originally the sauce that was introduced from China to make the noodle dish was saltier, richer, and of a deep brown color. Chefs at Incheon, Korea later added in caramel to sweeten the sauce, and added grains that darkened the sauce to copy the jet-black-brown color over time.

In the mid-1950s in South Korea, immediately after the Korean War, jajangmyeon was sold at low prices so that anyone could eat it without economic burden. The new Korean-style jajangmyeon became popular among merchants visiting the port of Incheon, the center of trade, and the many dock workers working in the fish market, and quickly spread throughout the country, being recognized as its "own dish" rather than a copied version of the traditional Chinese one.

== Preparation and serving ==
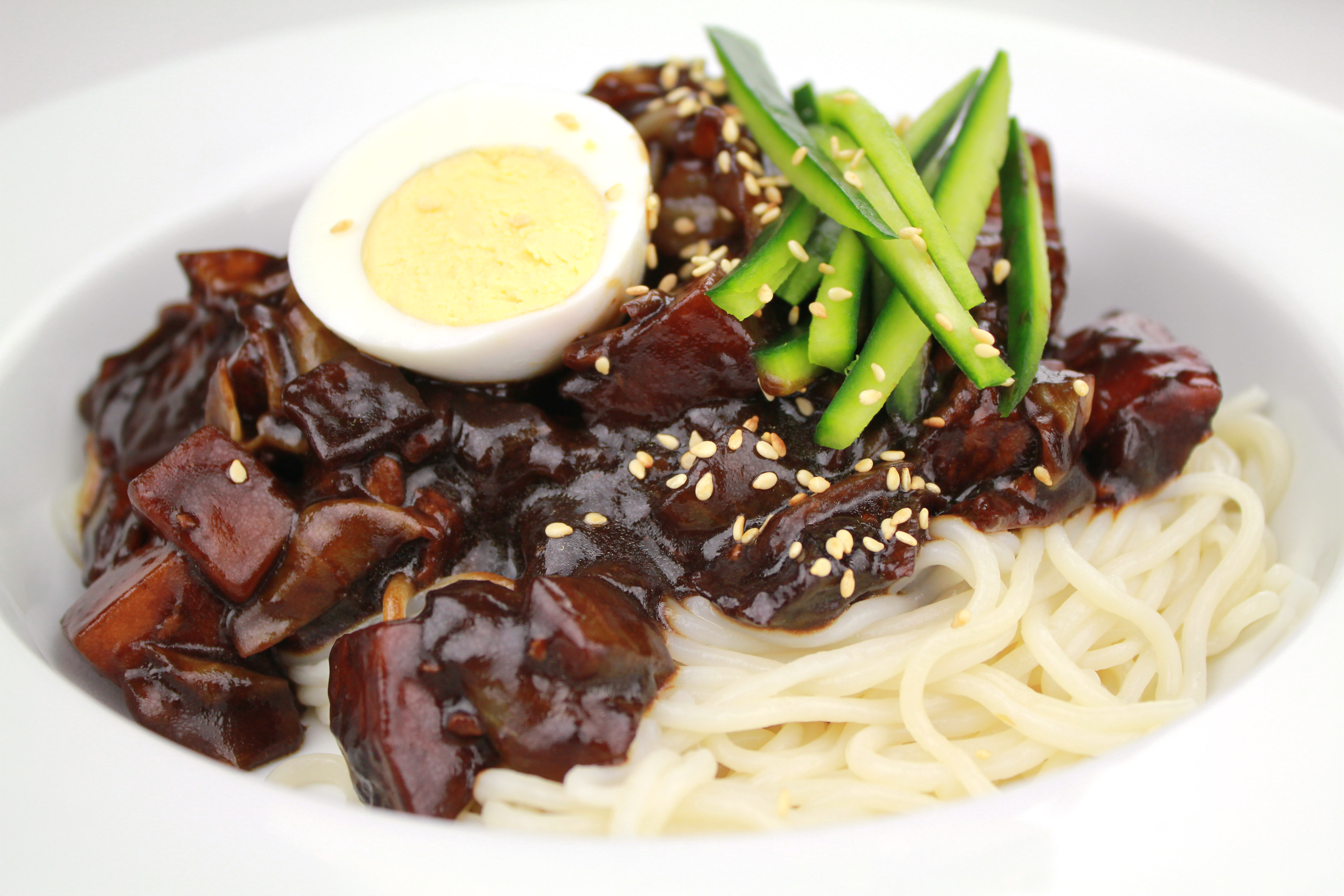
Jajangmyeon topped with a hard-boiled egg, julienned cucumber, and toasted sesame seeds

Jajangmyeon uses thick, hand-made or machine-pulled noodles made from wheat flour, salt, baking soda, and water. The sauce, jajang, is made with fried chunjang with other ingredients, such as soy sauce (or oyster sauce), meat (usually pork, but sometimes beef), seafood (usually squid or shrimp), aromatics (scallions, ginger, and garlic), vegetables (usually onions, zucchini or Korean zucchini, or cabbage), stock, and starch slurry.

When served, jajangmyeon may be topped with julienned cucumber, scallions, egg garnish, boiled or fried egg, blanched shrimp or stir-fried bamboo shoot slices. The dish is usually served with danmuji (yellow pickled radish), sliced raw onions, and chunjang sauce for dipping the onions.

== Variations ==
Variations of the jajangmyeon dish include gan-jjajang, jaengban-jjajang, yuni-jjajang, and samseon-jjajang.

- Gan-jjajang (간짜장) – Jajangmyeon with a dry sauce, made without adding water (stock) and starch slurry. The letter gan comes from the Chinese pronunciation of the character 乾 (Korean: 건; RR: geon; Chinese pinyin: gān) meaning "dry". However, it is now changing to mean that the chunjang itself is thick as it is lightly stir-fried in oil without any moisture from the vegetables so that no water comes out. The sauce and noodles are usually served separately.
- Jaengban-jjajang(쟁반짜장) – Jajangmyeon made by stir-frying the parboiled noodles with the sauce in a wok, and served on a plate instead of in a bowl. Jaengban means "plate" in Korean.
- Yuni-jjajang (유니짜장) – Jajangmyeon made with ground meat. The word yuni derived from the Korean reading of the Chinese word ròuní (肉泥; Korean reading: 육니, yungni) meaning "ground meat". Although yungni is not a word in Korean, the loanword yuni, used only in the dish name yuni-jjajang, is likely to have been derived from Chinese immigrants' pronunciation of the Korean reading of the word, with the dropping of the coda k (or ng, due to the Korean phonotactics) which is difficult for native Mandarin speakers to pronounce.
- Samseon-jjajang (삼선짜장) – Jajangmyeon which incorporates seafood such as squid and mussel. The word samseon derives from the Korean reading of the Chinese word sānxiān (三鮮) meaning "three fresh ingredients".

There can be combinations. For example. samseon-gan-jjajang may refer to seafood jajangmyeon made without adding water.

Dishes such as jajang-bap and jajang-tteok-bokki also exist. Jajang-bap is essentially the same dish as jajangmyeon, but served with rice instead of noodles. Jajang-tteok-bokki is tteok-bokki served with jajang sauce instead of the usual spicy sauce. Bul jajangmyeon is a spicy variation of jajangmyeon.

Instant jajangmyeon products, such as Chapagetti, Chacharoni, and Zha Wang, are instant noodle versions of jajangmyeon consisting of dried noodles that are boiled in the same manner as ramyeon, using dried vegetable pieces that are drained and mixed with jajang powder or liquid jajang sauce, as well as a small amount of water and oil.

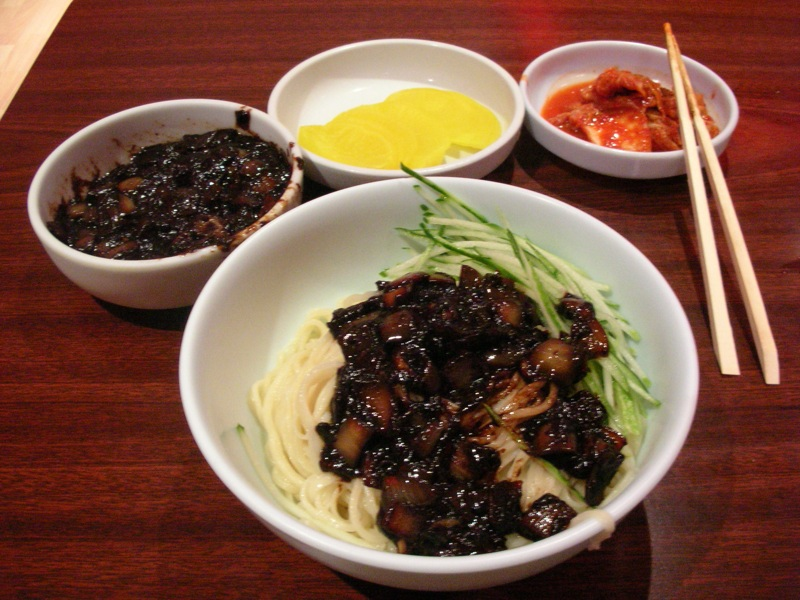
Gan-jjajang

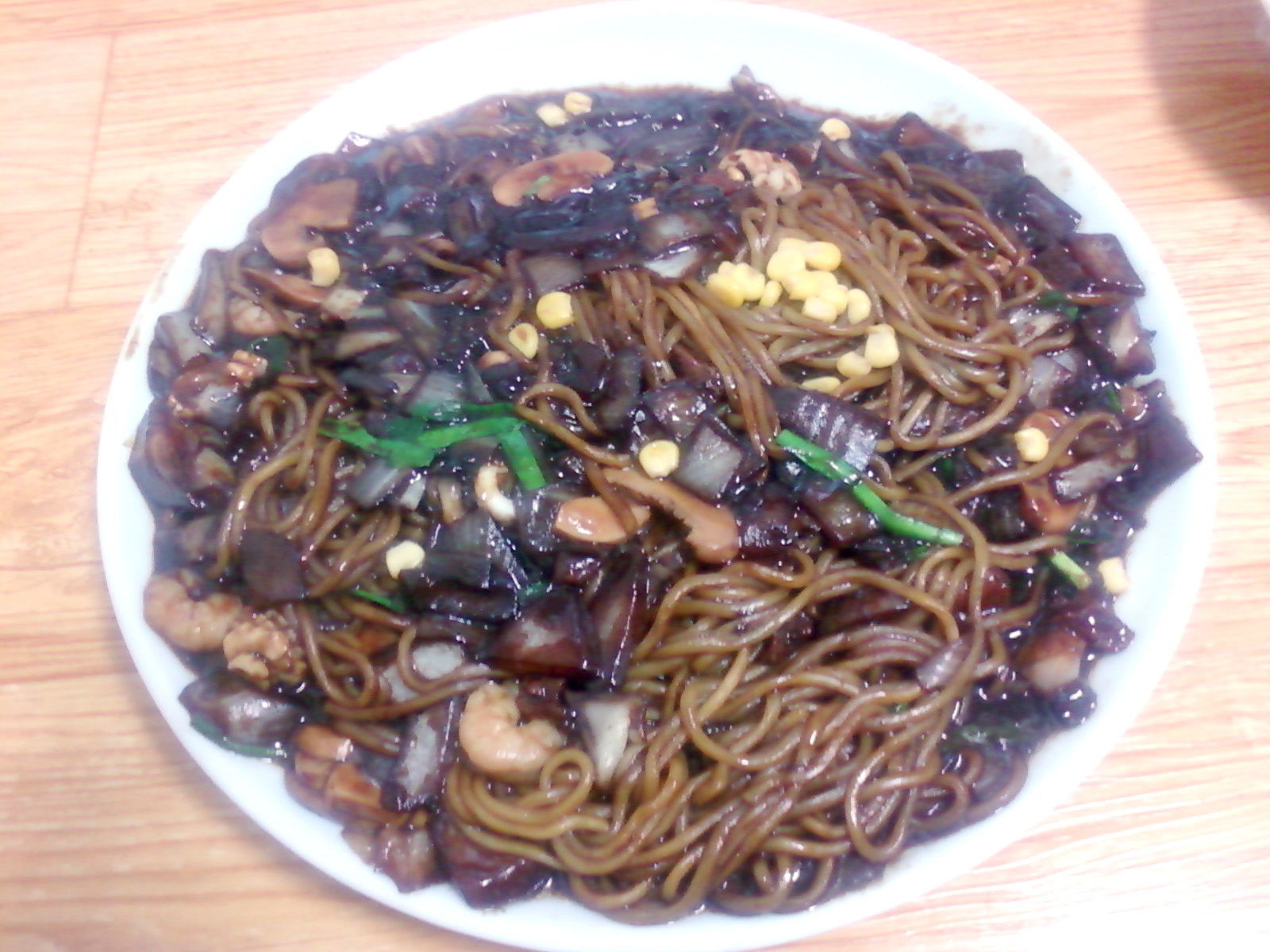
Jaengban-jjajang

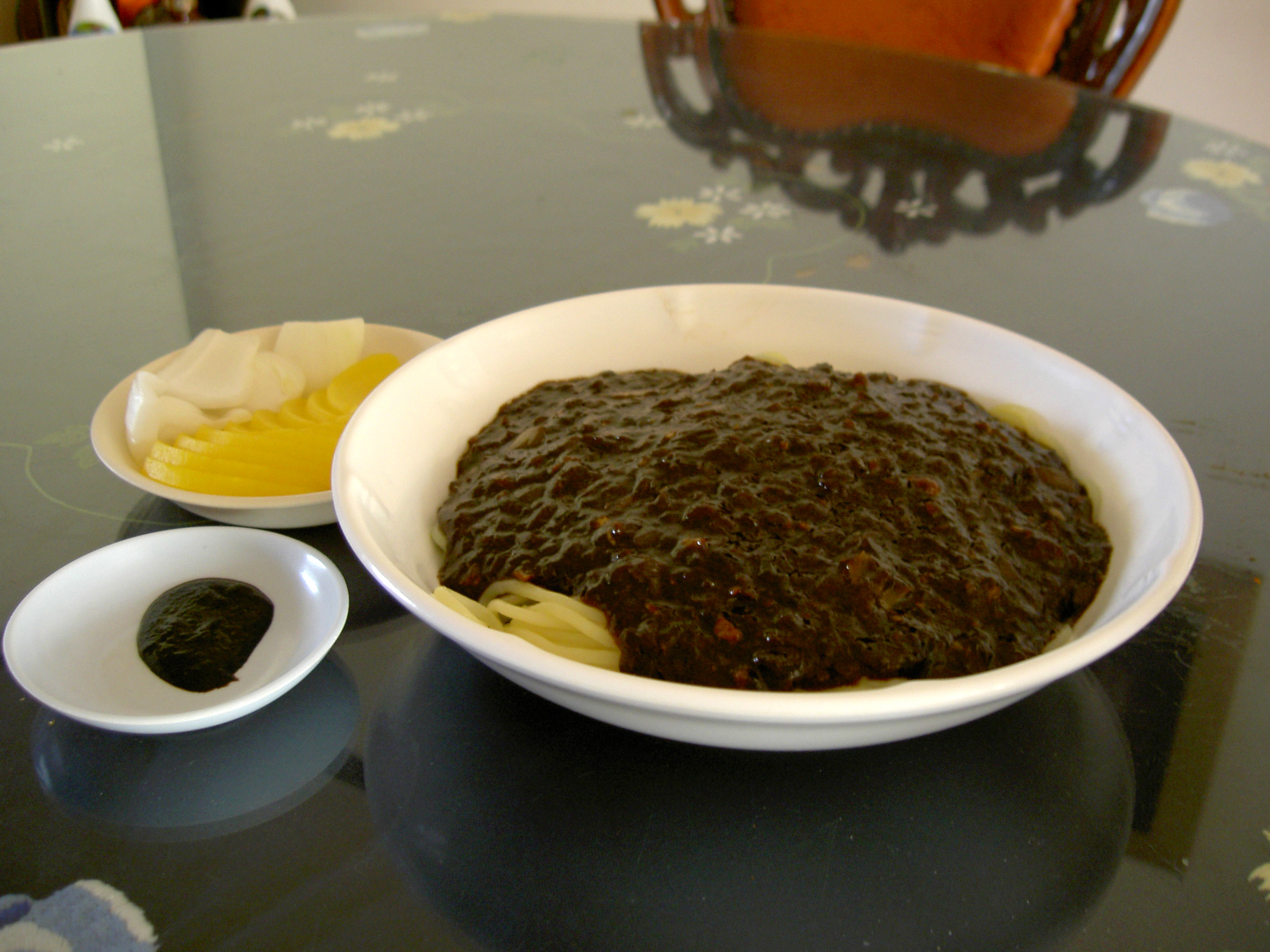
Yuni-jjajang

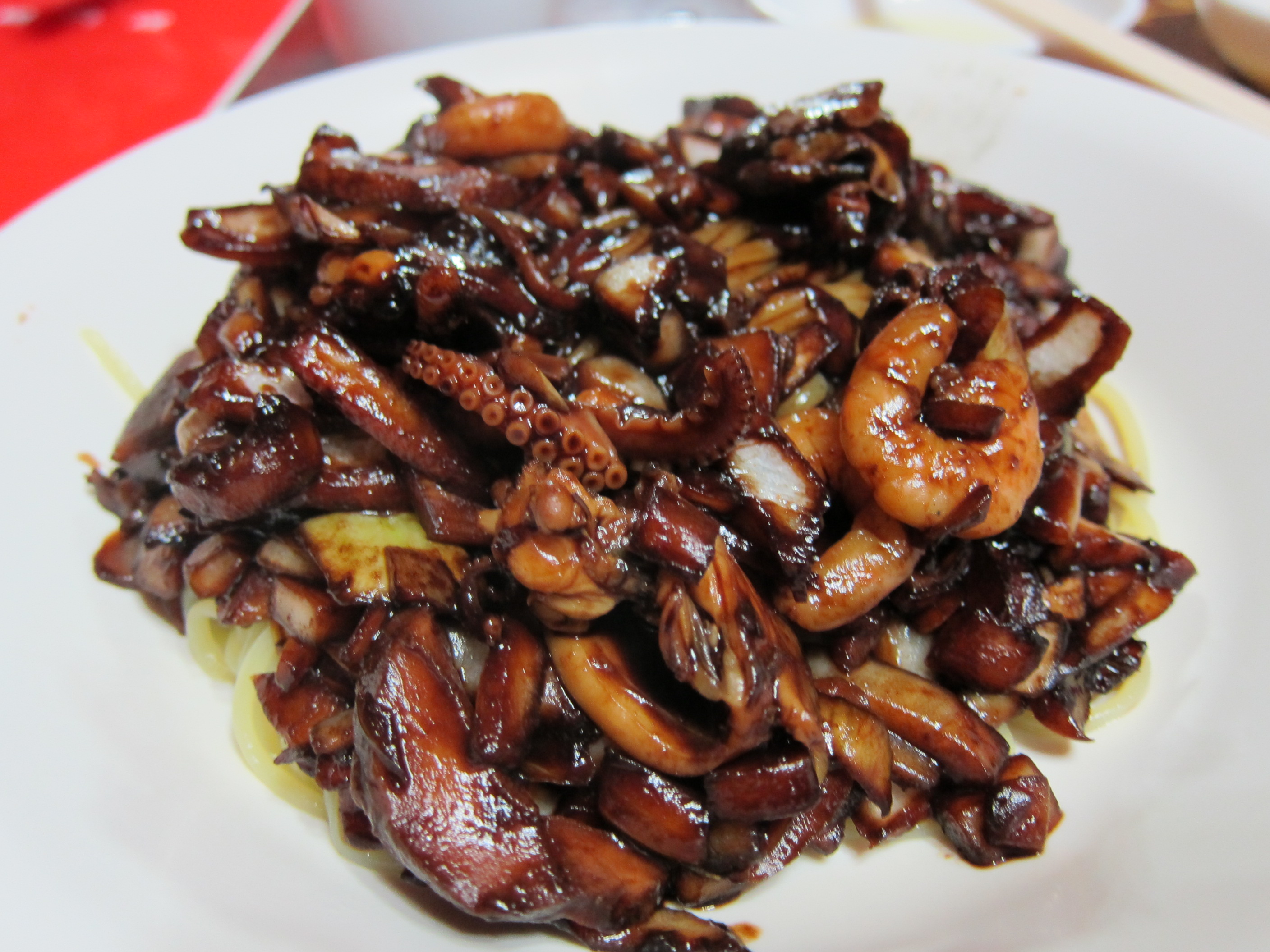
Samseon-gan-jjajang

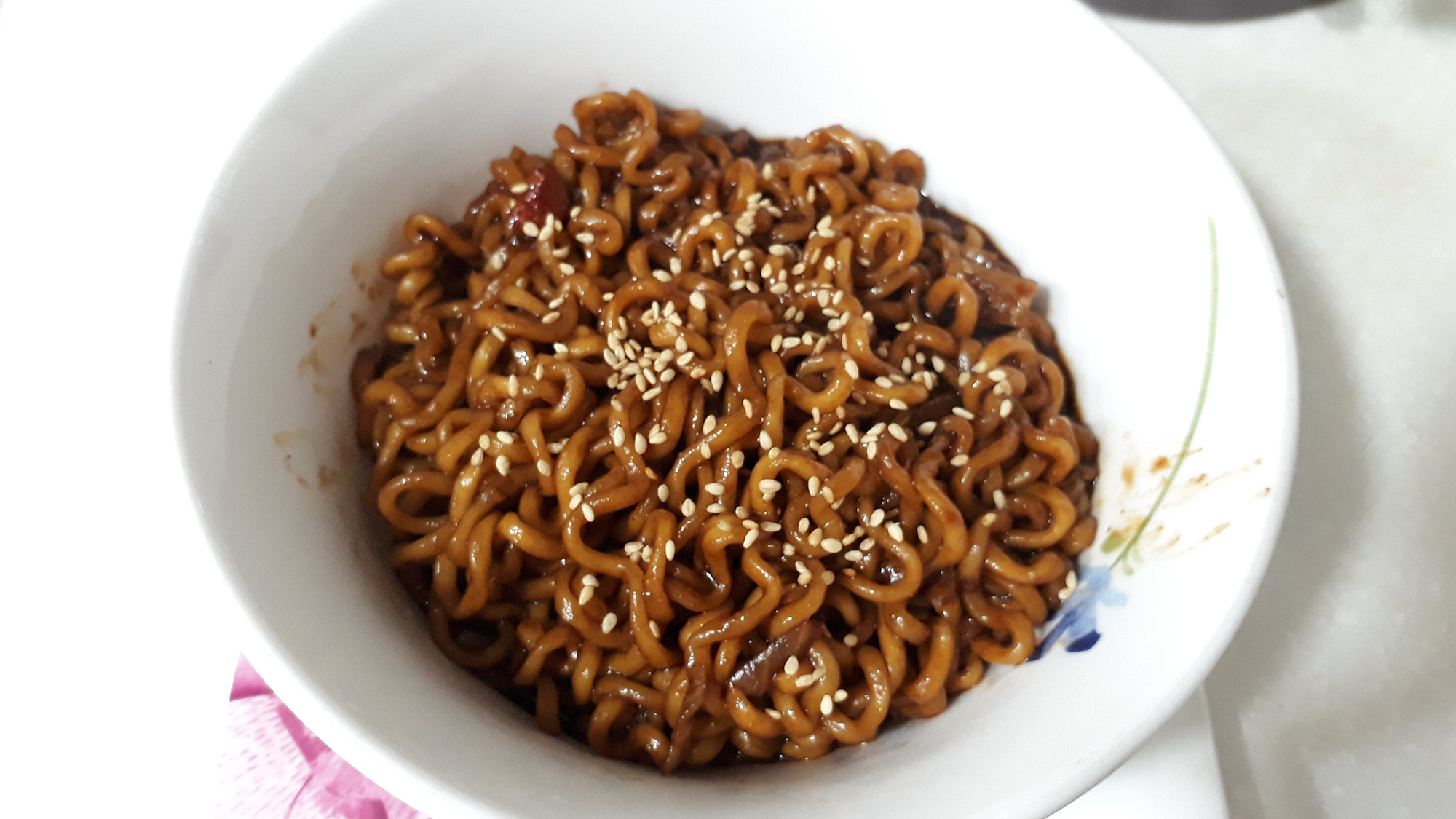
Chapagetti

== See also ==
- Black Day
- Zhajiangmian
- Morioka jajamen
