= Jang (food) =

Sauce in Korean cuisine

- Clockwise from top left: Doenjang, ganjang, and gochujang
- Type: Sauce
- Associated cuisine: Korean cuisine
- Main ingredients: Meju (fermented soybean), salt, water
- Variations: Ganjang, doenjang, gochujang, cheonggukjang, ssamjang

Korean name
- Hangul: 장
- Hanja: 醬
- Lit.: sauce
- RR: jang
- MR: chang

Jang is a category of sauce in Korean cuisine, generally fermented and made of soybeans. The three main types are ganjang, (soy sauce), doenjang (soy paste), and gochujang (chili paste). Jang is a central element of Korean cuisine, widely used as an ingredient, seasoning, or dipping sauce.

Ganjang, doenjang, and gochujang are often produced in an annual batch. It involves multiple stages of fermentation over months, using jars known as jangdok. The main ingredient is meju, a dried block of soybeans. Meju is placed in a brine solution, forming a solid, which becomes doenjang, and a liquid, which becomes ganjang. Gochujang is made by combining powdered meju, Korean chili pepper, and other ingredients. Other varieties include cheonggukjang, simply consisting of fermented soybeans, as well as various combinations of jangs, including ssamjang.

The fermentation of jang, driven by various bacteria and fungi, develops amino acids and peptides that result in a complex flavor. Industrial products have simpler flavors as their fermentation is more controlled. Jang is salty and is used to flavor most Korean side dishes. It is a typical component of a Korean meal.

Jang originated in prehistoric Korea. The word jang entered Korean from Chinese; literally meaning 'sauce', it became widely used for fermented soybean sauces. These were common by the Three Kingdoms period of Korea, as mentioned in Chinese and Japanese sources. Their importance increased in the Joseon era, being made by all social classes; several varieties, including gochujang, originated in this era. The making of jang decreased in the 20th century, impacted by the Japanese occupation, Korean War, and ensuing economic decline. It resurged in the 21st century amid government initiatives and global interest in Korean culture. Gochujang became common globally, though jang is otherwise unfamiliar beyond Korea.

== Etymology ==
Jang (Korean: 장; Hanja: 醬) is the Korean word for sauce, derived from the Chinese jiàng (醬). It more specifically refers to soy-based fermented products—though it historically encompassed sauces based on meat and fish. (Note: Though most jangs are soybean products, the category may include fish sauces such as jeotgal. Categories of fermented sauces include the typical soy jang (dujang) as well as fish jang (eojang) and meat jang (yukjang), though the latter is no longer common.) The Chinese word jiàng is first attested in the Rites of Zhou from the 2nd century BC, referring to a fermented meat dish. Its first use to refer to a soybean sauce (doujiang) was in the Lunheng in 80 AD.

== Description ==
Ganjang

Doenjang

Gochujang

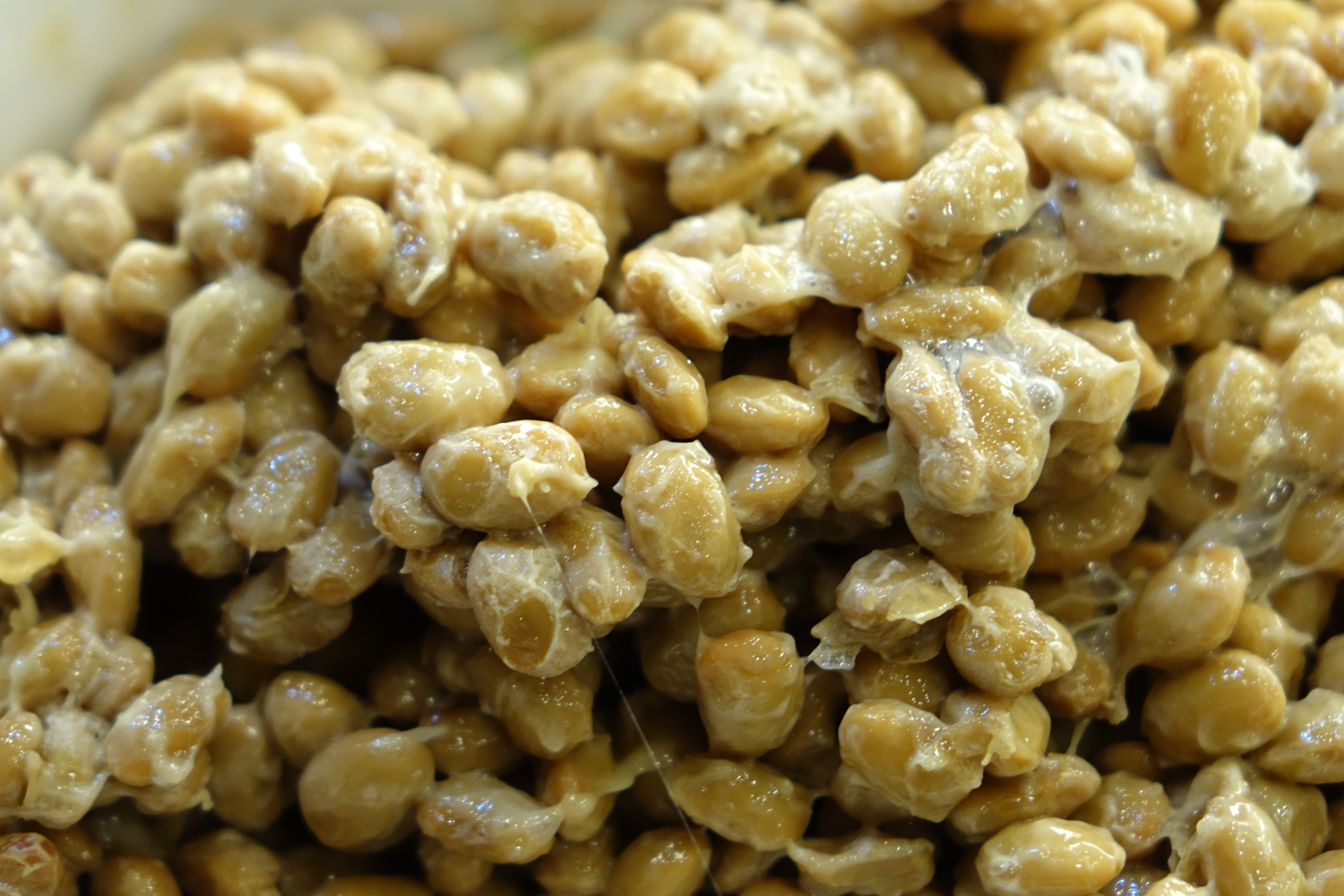
Cheonggukjang

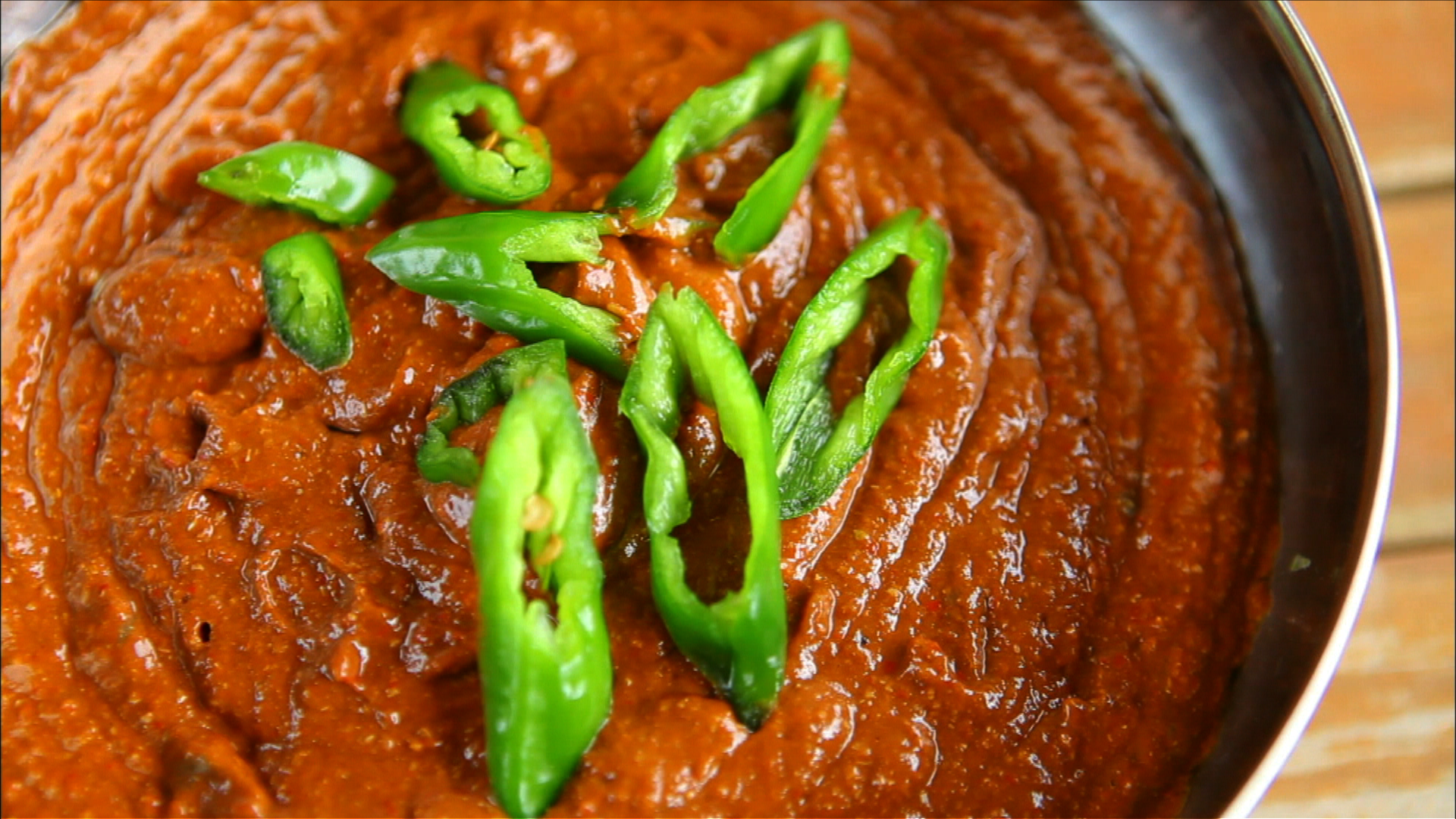
Ssamjang

Yangnyeomjang

Types of jang

Korean sauces are fermented, unlike sauces in Western cuisine, which generally consist of liquids mixed with seasonings. Its fermentation techniques are similar to jiàng in Chinese cuisine, though the ingredients differ, as the latter typically contains meat or fish.

The three main sauces of Korean cuisine are ganjang, a type of soy sauce; doenjang, a soy paste similar to miso; and gochujang, a chili paste with no parallels in other cuisines. Their base ingredient is a dried block of soybeans, known as meju, also used for some less common types. However, cheonggukjang is made by fermenting whole soybeans, the simplest form of jang.

Other types of jang are made of the three main jangs. One of the most common is ssamjang, which mixes doenjang and gochujang. Others include cho-gochujang, which is based on vinegar; jeupjang, which uses vegetables and other ingredients; as well as yangnyeomjang, a broad category of sauces that may include the three main jangs.

Less common varieties include gyeopjang, made by mixing aged ganjang with fresh meju; makjang, made by mixing meju and saltwater into a paste; and damppukjang, made by mixing powdered meju and red chili. Barley is used for garujang, in which steamed, ground barley is mixed with powdered meju, and borijang, which is similar but uses fermented barley.

== Preparation ==
=== Ingredients ===
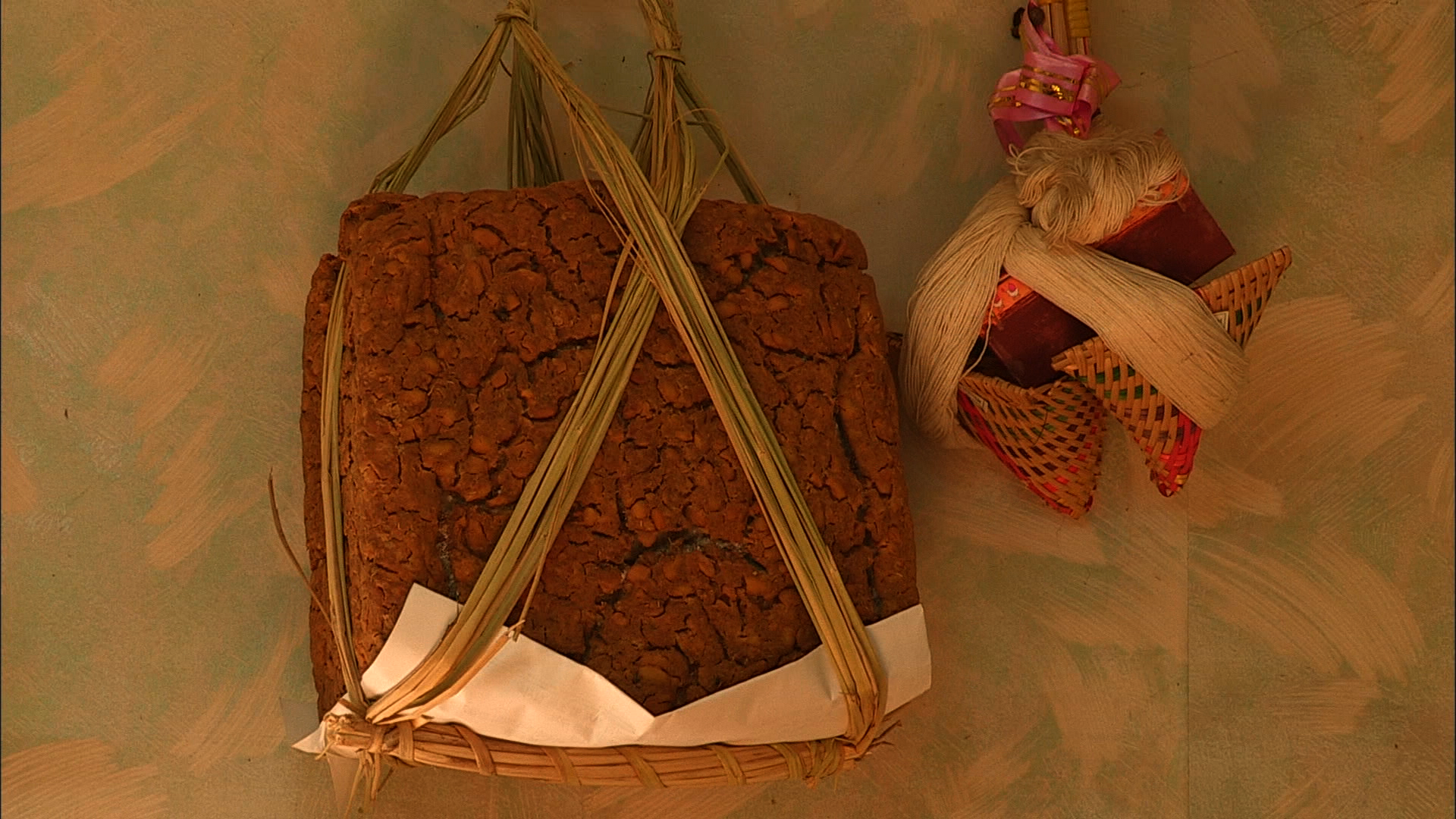
Meju drying

The basic ingredients of jang are soybeans, salt, and water. There are no additional ingredients in some types of jang, including ganjang, doenjang, and cheonggukjang, whereas others, such as gochujang, have additional ingredients. Some types of jang contain salt, which results in a longer fermentation time and a longer shelf life, but cheonggukjang, which does not contain salt, does not last long.

Preparing jang begins with preparing meju. Soybeans are harvested around late October, then boiled and drained. In late October or early November, (Note: Under the Korean calendar, the creation of meju may take place in the tenth month. Fermentation may continue for about three months until the Korean New Year.) they are made into meju by being mashed and shaped into blocks, then dried for about 4–5 weeks. This is fermented for 1–3 months in an outdoor location; this often involves being wrapped in rice straw and hung from a roof, as the straw introduces the koji mold (Aspergillus).

=== Traditional process ===
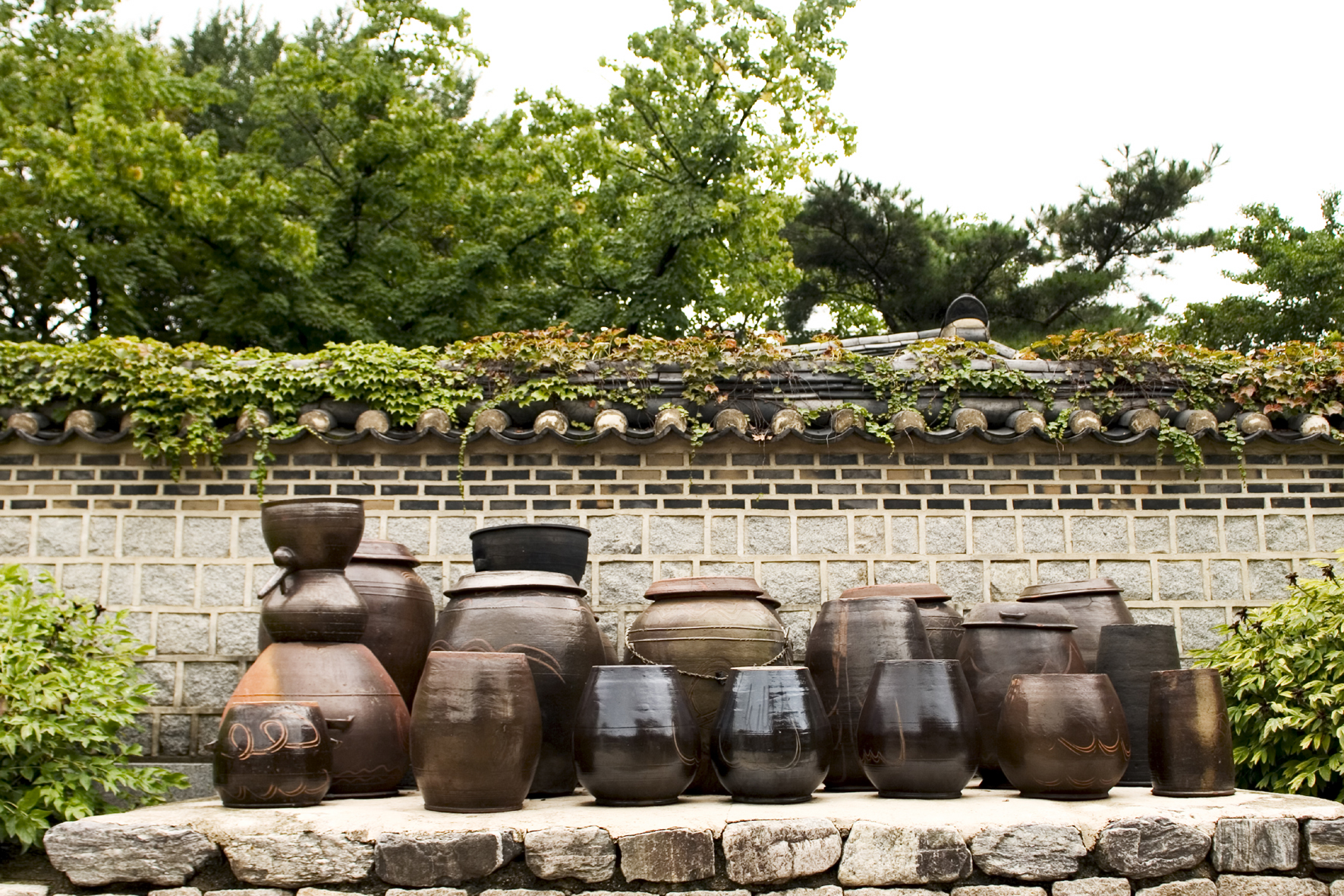
Jangdok placed outdoors.

In the traditional process, batches of ganjang, doenjang, and gochujang are made together. It begins in late autumn or early winter, after the harvest. It involves two stages of fermentation, first as meju and then as the final products, for a total of at least six months. Artisanal producers ferment the final product for much longer; most are aged for 3–10 years, and some for even longer. (Note: Doenjang may be aged for up to 7 years. Ganjang may aged for about 10 years, and to be sold commercially, Korean regulations mandate a minimum of 1 year.)

An annual batch of jang may be made to last the rest of the year. However, weather conditions may cause a batch to fail—as microorganisms that drive fermentation are affected by temperature—requiring the cook to wait until the next autumn to try again.

In December or January, meju is moved to a porous clay jar known as a jangdok, a type of onggi. The jar measures up to 80 litres (18 imp gal; 21 US gal) (Note: Jangdok are larger than the onggi used for kimchi.) and is slightly porous and breathable, enabling fermentation. One jangdok is used for ganjang and doenjang, while a portion of meju is powdered to prepare gochujang in a separate jangdok.

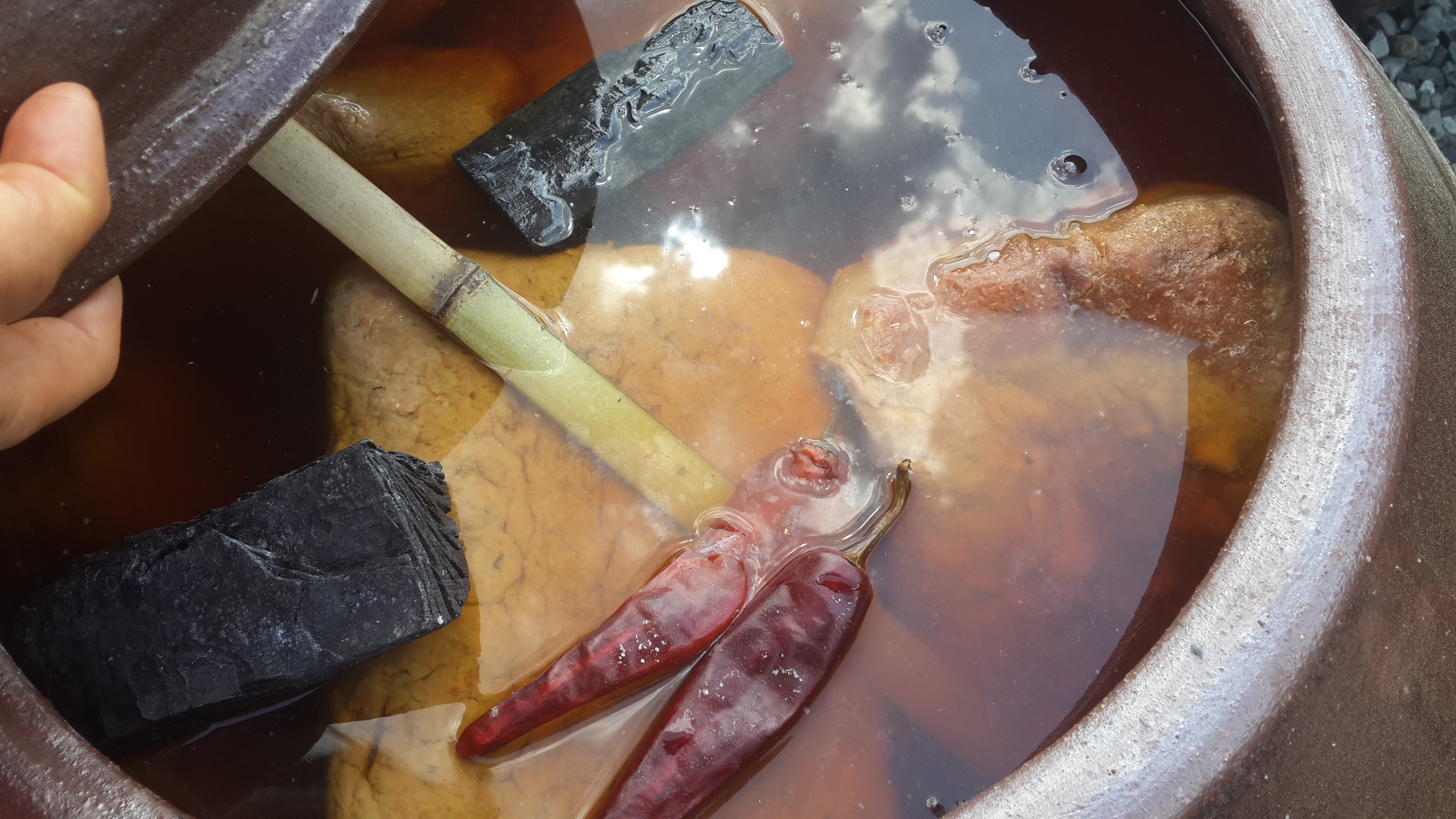
Meju fermenting in brine

To make ganjang and doenjang, meju is then placed in a brine, consisting of water, salt, and malt syrup. Additions may include jujubes and red peppers for flavor, as well as charcoal and red peppers for purification and sterilization. (Note: In Korean folk religion, charcoal is seen as pure and red peppers are seen as warding off evil. Scientifically, charcoal is used for filtration and the capsaicin in red peppers is antibacterial.) The brine fills about half of the jar, to allow expansion, and its salinity may be determined by ensuring that an egg floats on it. It is fermented for another 1–2 months. It undergoes reactions producing a liquid and a precipitate, which are separated to make ganjang and doenjang, respectively. The timing of separation is subjective and must achieve a balance between the two components; the liquid becomes richer as the solid loses its flavor. The solid, known as doen, is mixed with grain and more meju to make doenjang, while the liquid is boiled to make ganjang. Both are aged again for at least a few months.

Gochujang may contain ganjang, so it is the last of the three to be made. It is made of a different kind of meju, in which the soy is mixed with rice or wheat. This may be fermented for as little as 3 weeks, as rice ferments faster. Powdered meju is mixed with red pepper powder and either salt or ganjang. Other ingredients vary, often including rice starch, as well as a sweetener such as rice syrup or malted barley. The pepper used is generally the Korean chili pepper (gochu), which is mildly spicy and grows only in Korea. The resulting paste is fermented for the final 3–6 months, or up to a year.

Cheonggukjang is made only of boiled soybeans and is fermented for a much shorter time, about 2–4 days, and at a higher temperature, about 40–50 °C (104–122 °F). Meju would crack in such heat. Cheonggukjang is fermented with rice straw, either covering the soybeans with straw to dry them or using microorganisms extracted from the straw.

Several cultural practices are associated with the process of jang. Korean folklore states that failed fermentation of jang may be the work of evil spirits, who may target people who are insincere in making jang. Superstitious people choose days without evil spirits to make jang, bathing before making it. These traditions may reflect the influence of hygiene and weather on jang. Another tradition is to tie the jar with geumjul, a type of rope that wards off evil, containing charcoal and red peppers.

=== Industrial process ===
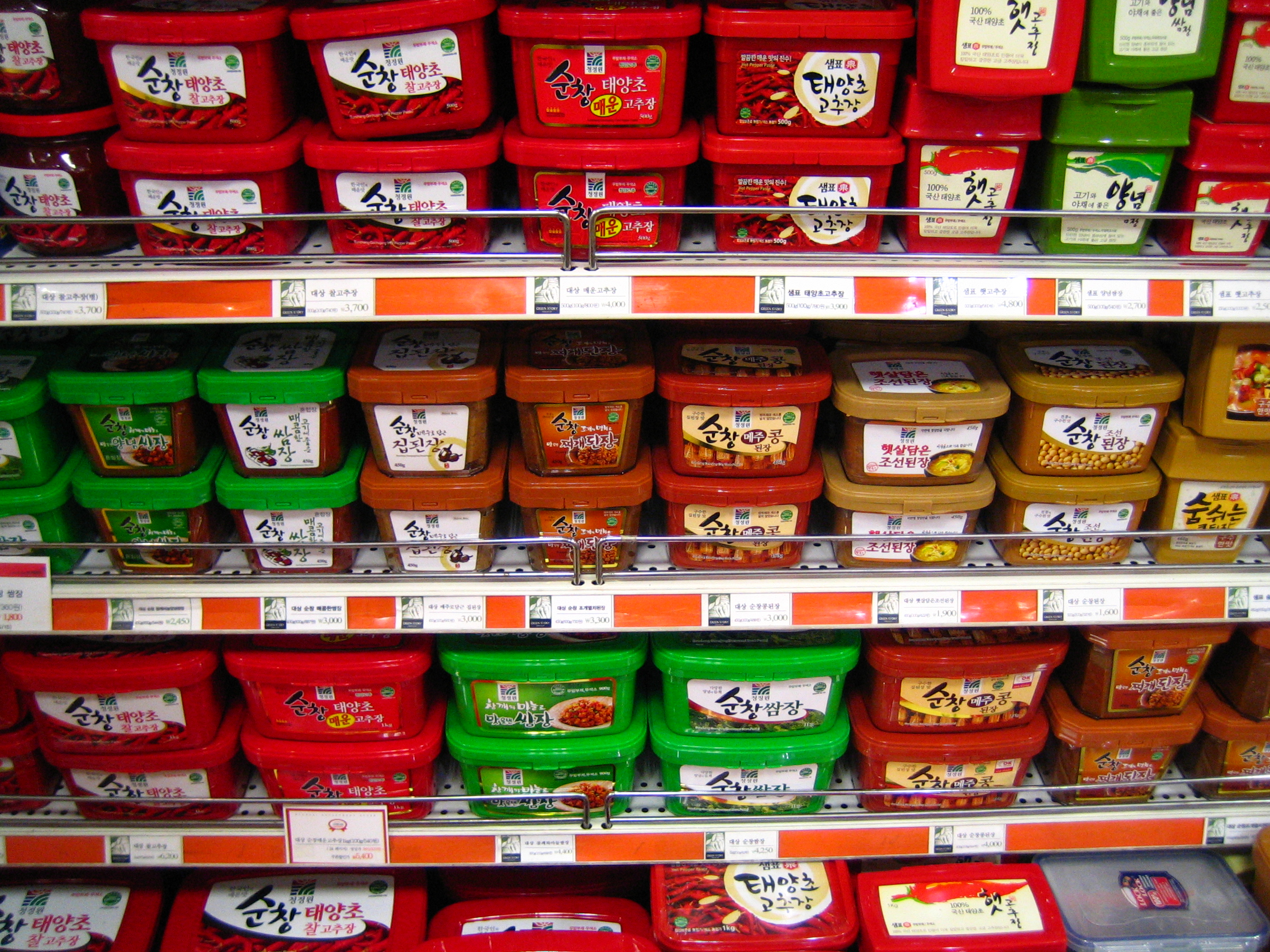
Commercial jang products

Industrial production of jang controls the conditions of fermentation by placing the ingredients in a sterlized environment and adding specific microorganisms. It is typically fermented with only one microorganism, resulting in a simple, sweet flavor.

In industrial settings, ganjang and doenjang are made separately. Ganjang is made of soy powder and wheat flour with fermented with koji. Commercial varieties of ganjang include yangjo ganjang, which uses wheat due to influence from Japanese soy sauce, and the cheaper jin ganjang, which is made by treating soy with enzymes. Commercial doenjang may also use wheat, making it sweeter.

== Use ==
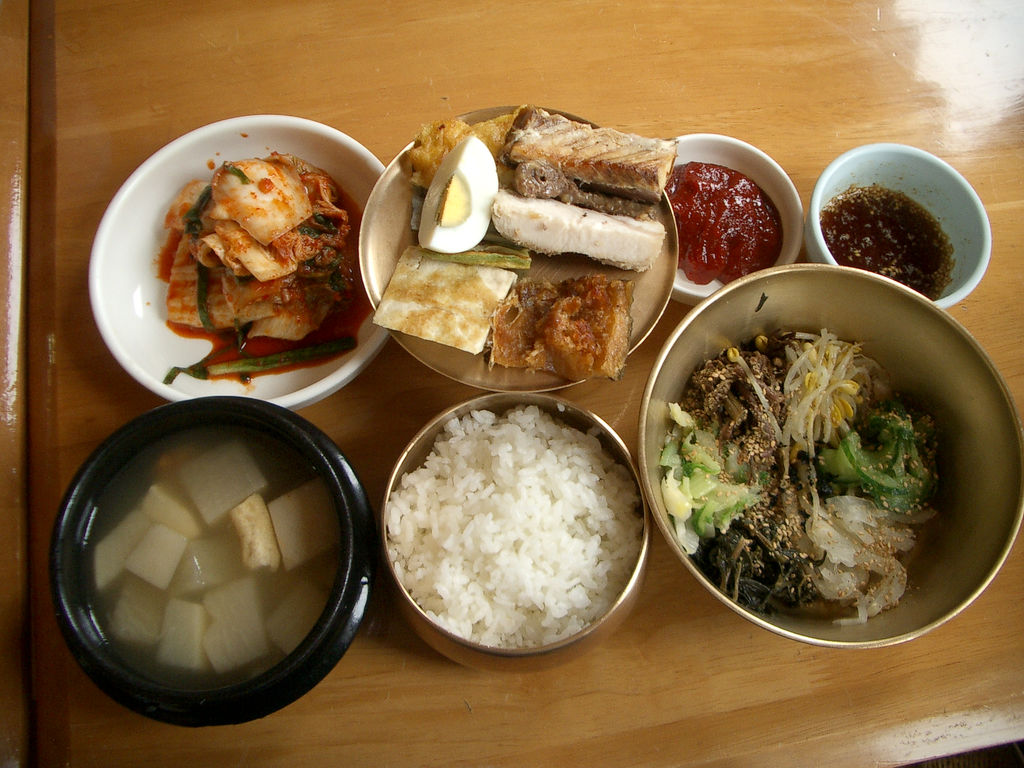
A Korean meal typically features jang.

Jang may be used as an ingredient or served individually. As jang contains salt, it is used to make food salty. Korean cuisine typically uses jang, rather than salt itself, as seasoning; it is used alongside sesame oil, perilla oil, garlic, and chilis. Multiple jangs are often used together.

Jang is used with various foods, including vegetables, meat, and fish. A Korean meal consists of rice (bap), and side dishes (banchan), including vegetable dishes (namul), typically alongside jang and kimchi. As vegetables have little flavor on their own, they are eaten with jang. Gochujang is commonly used as a dipping sauce, while ssamjang is a dipping sauce for ssam, a dish wrapped in lettuce.

Jang is an ingredient in many foods in Korea, including desserts, and it may be used to preserve food. Jangajji consists of vegetables pickled in jang, preserving them through fermentation. Braised meat preparations—jorim and jjim—sometimes use jang. Ganjang may be used in marinades, broths, or sauces for vegetables.

Most dishes, besides bap, are made with jang; these include banchan, namul, stir-fries, and kimchi. Jjajangmyeon is a noodle dish made with jang. Gochujang is a dish consisting of rice and banchan mixed with jang, particularly gochujang. Other dishes made with gochujang include bibim-guksu and gochujang jjigae.

Jang is often combined with other ingredients in soups (guk) and stews (jjigae). Doenjang is usually eaten as a soup, doenjang-guk often flavored with onion, garlic, and red pepper, though it may also be served with vegetables. Cheonggukjang is usually used with vegetables in guk or jjigae.

== Nutrition and properties ==
=== Nutrition ===
Jang is high in protein, which is present in raw soybeans. Most soybean-based foods undergo processing that denatures the protein, making it more digestible, and boiling soybeans removes antinutrients. Jang is also typically high in salt and starch. It can provide nutrients including fiber, and vitamin B_{12}, as well as various bioactive compounds. It also contains amino acids, peptides, and isoflavones. Fermentation produces yeasts that have probiotic properties. Some research attributes several health benefits to jang.

=== Fermentation ===
The flavor and properties of jang are very different from its original ingredients due to the fermentation. Fermentation develops various microorganisms, contributing to complex flavors. Much of this process cannot be controlled by humans as the natural environment determines the development of microorganisms. The flavor is affected by factors including heat, moisture, hygiene, and the proportion of salt to water—which must be high enough to have a good flavor but low enough to enable fermentation.

The fermentation of meju is driven by various fungi, including yeasts, (Note: Yeasts present in jang are mostly of the families Debaryomycetaceae and Saccharomycetaceae.) as well as Bacillus bacteria. Cheonggukjang uses only Bacillus. Gochujang involves more diverse microorganisms because it has more ingredients. The use of Bacillus in fermented soybean products is also common across East and Southeast Asia. The koji fungus is the agent of savoriness, as it is in other soy products and rice wines.

=== Sensory properties ===
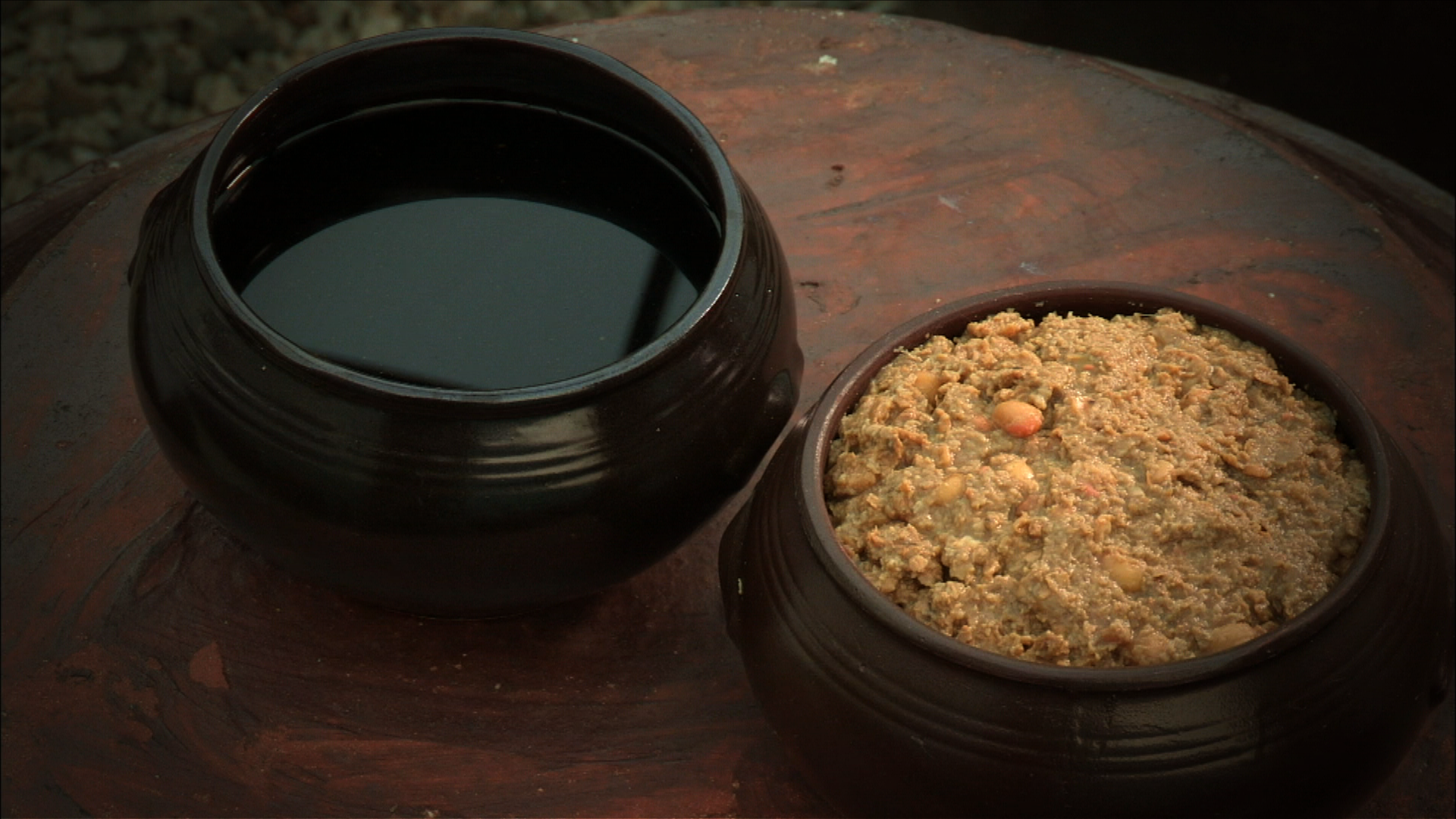
Ganjang and doenjang are contain amino acids, which contribute to a savory taste and brown color.

Fermentation breaks down the soybeans' proteins into amino acids, which form peptides, the main component of the flavor of jang. It also breaks down carbohydrates into simple sugars, which enable further fermentation that produces compounds including organic acids. Ganjang and doenjang are savory due to amino acids and organic acids. The proportion of amino acids determines bitterness.

As a seasoning, jang contributes more flavor than pure salt as it contains metabolites from fermentation, which have been shown to improve the taste of food. Doenjang contains savory, sweet, salty, and bitter tastes. The fermentation of gochujang breaks down both protein and starch, making it savory and sweet, as well as being spicy due to the pepper.

Amino acids undergo the Maillard reaction to give ganjang and doenjang a brown color. Doenjang is a lighter brown when fresh and darkens over time. Gochujang is red due to the pepper, a color that remains visible in foods made with it. Jang is high in aromatic compounds, giving it its smell.

== History ==
=== Origin ===
Soybeans were used in Korea by the second millennium BC, having first been cultivated around Korea and Manchuria. As soybeans cannot be eaten raw, prehistoric peoples began cooking them. The fermentation of soybeans likely began in the Dongyi culture of Korea and Manchuria.

Ancient cultures across East Asia fermented soybeans to produce sauces or pastes. Koreans developed a cuisine that, unlike Chinese cuisine, did not rely on cooking oil. Thus, they processed soybeans into jang and tofu, rather than soybean oil, and the flavor of food came from jang rather than cooking with high heat. As most of the food available in ancient Korea was plant-based, fermented soybeans became a defining element of Korean cuisine.

Jang emerged in prehistoric Korea, so its early history is speculative. Its creation may have come from the use of nuruk, another fermented product, to make foods palatble. Early jang was often made of meat or fish, but soybeans became more common. Cheonggukjang may have been the earliest example of soybean jang, being very simple, and was perhaps created accidentally. As cheonggukjang has a low shelf life, meju may have been developed later to preserve soybeans. These foods likely existed by the Bronze Age, resembling their modern form. Archaeological evidence of jang appears by the 3rd century AD, with artwork in the Anak Tomb depicting jangdok jars.

=== First written records ===
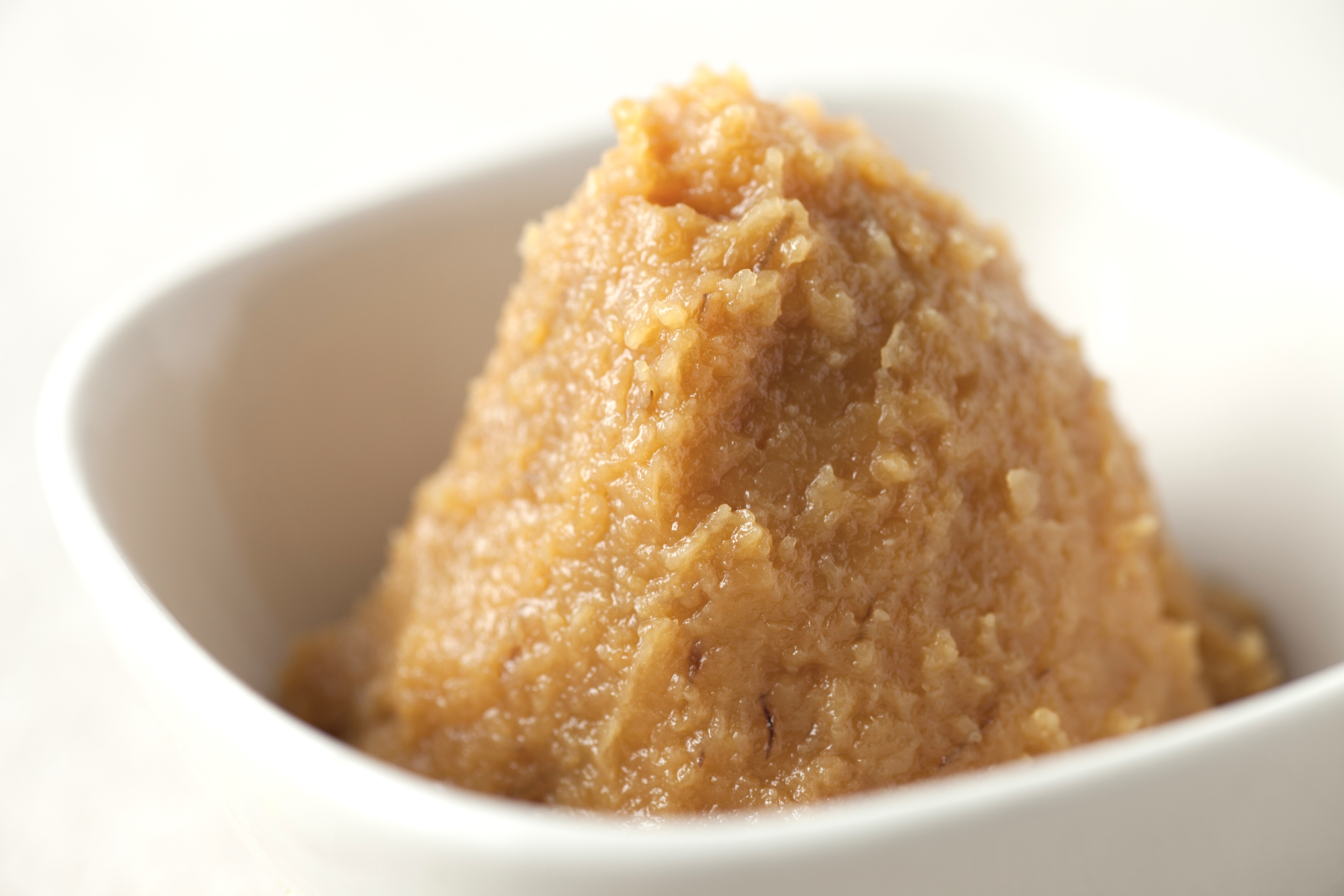
Japanese miso, possibly adapted from jang

Jang was common by the Three Kingdoms period of Korea (57 BC – 668 AD). Ganjang and doenjang were internationally traded by the era of the Han dynasty in China (202 BC – 220 AD). The first record of jang is in the Chinese Sanguozhi, dating to the 290s. One of its chapters describes Korea, and mentions that the Korean kingdom of Goguryeo was home to "people who make good fermented soybean sauces". In 683, jang and meju were among the many gifts for the marriage between Sinmun of Silla and Queen Sinmok, indicating that these were valuable items; this was recounted in the 1145 history Samguk sagi.

Goguryeo experienced a cultural exchange of jang with China and Japan. Chinese sources associated the smell of doenjang with Korea, indicating that it was unique to Korea. Japanese sources, including the Taihō Code of 701, mention maljang, a type of jang similar to cheonggukjang but with slower fermentation. Japanese texts translated to maljang as miso, and it may have been the origin of Japanese miso, as stated in a 1707 work by historian Arai Hakuseki. Doenjang was also introduced to Japan during the Nara period (710–784).

Korean records of jang first appear in the Goryeo era (918–1392). By this era, the word jang became distinct from si, a now-obsolete word for soybean products. Goryeo records indicate that jang was one of the main staple foods: a policy proposal by politician Ch'oe Sŭng-no in 982 recommended donating food including jang to homeless people, and an account in the Goryeosa states that, during the Khitan invasion, emperor Hyeonjong distribted jang as famine food in 1018. Jang was also considered medicinal; the 1236 text Hyangyak gugeupbang recommended it to treat gonorrhea.

=== Joseon era ===
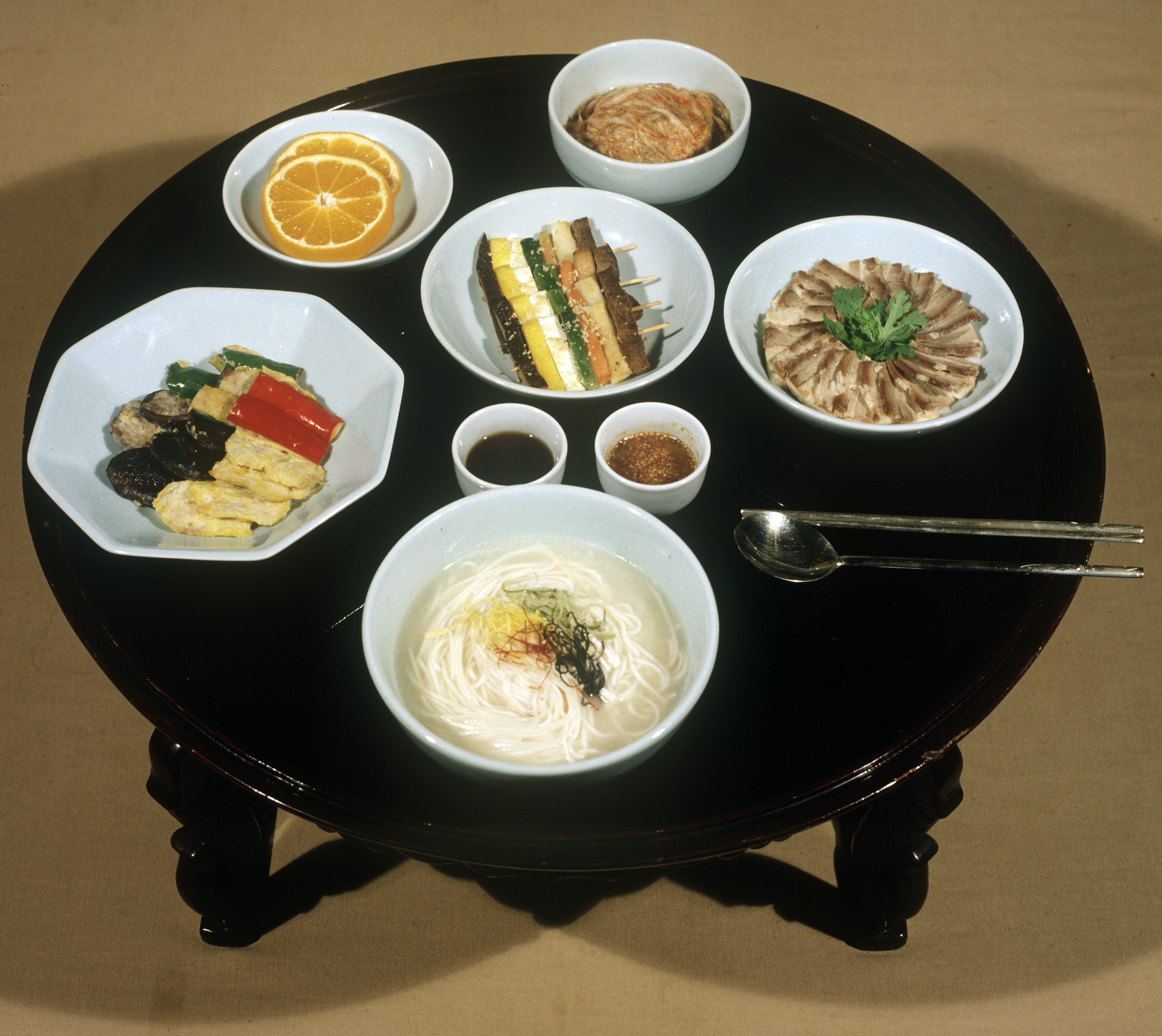
Recreation of food served at the Joseon royal court

Jang became a very important food in the Joseon empire (1392–1910). It was eaten by all social classes, and its preparation was seen as an important job. This reflected the kingdom's Confucian ideals of tradition and family structure. The royal court included a position known as jang-go-mama, or 'keeper of the jangs', usually held by men, whereas upper-class households assigned the task to the eldest female member. Buddhist monks, who were vegetarian, made jang at monasteries. The structure of the Korean meal was established during the Joseon era, always including jang; royal meals featured three types of jang.

The Joseon era saw a diversification of Korean food, and many recipes for jang were recorded. New methods included preparing ganjang and doenjang separately and adding non-soy starches to meju. Cheonggukjang became more common and was first classified as jang during the Joseon era, before which it was known simply as cheongguk and eaten as a separate dish. The Gochujang is newer than other forms of jang, as chilis first became common in Korea in the late 16th and early 17th century. The 1766 book Chŭngbo sallim kyŏngje is the first attestation of gochujang and cheonggukjang.

Specialty jangs were invented during the Joseon era; a few, such as jeupjang, survive to the modern day. Many types included unusual ingredients, such as Korean radish, fish, beef, tofu, or the liquid from kimchi. Texts with descriptions of jang include the Dongguk Yi Sangguk jip (1241), which describes the use of pickled turnips for jang, and Nongga jipseong (1665), which mentions jeupjang and crab jang. Chŭngbo sallim kyŏngje describes versions with egg, red beans, and rice cakes, as well as other ingredients that can be used for nutrition. Some versions were adapted due to famine, adding doraji root, deodeok root, or soybean hulls to meju. Low-sodium jang, or damsujang, also became common during the Joseon era.

Chŭngbo sallim kyŏngje describes jang as the "foremost of all foods", making a pun between the word for sauce and the military rank jang to indicate its importance, and states that villagers who cannot afford meat can still be satisfied with the variety of jang. The 19th-century text Mokmin Simsǒ stated, "In years of poor harvest, people replace food with namuls, but they are difficult to swallow without adding salt. At that time, the price of salt will be expensive, so make plenty of jang in advance." The Kyuhap ch'ongsŏ by Yi Pinghŏgak (1809) describes the auspicious timing and placement of jang. The 1924 cookbook Joseon mussang sinsik yori jebeop stated, "Jang is added to various dishes for seasoning and taste. Therefore, it is the most important ingredient among Korean foods and must be prepared with the utmost sincerity in family affairs. Jang must be made at the right time, without missing the timing."

While Koreans placed importance on the flavor of jang, some foreign sources reduced the country's cuisine to heavy seasoning. For example, the 18th-century traveller Isabella Bird Bishop described "sauces of pungent and objectionable odors, the basis of most of them being capsicums and fermented rotten beans!"

=== 20th-century decline ===
When Korea was under Japanese rule (1910–1945), the government discouraged homemade jang, as it suppressed Korean culture. Most soy produced in Korea went to Japan. The industrialization of Japan contributed to the development of jang factories. Jang declined in popularity through World War II and the Korean War.

South Korea was a poor country when the Korean War ended in 1953. Soybeans were vital as a protein source that was resilient to soil conditions. Jang production shifted toward factories as Korea industralized and as few Koreans had the wherewithal to make it at home. The Korean Jang Cooperative was established in 1966, establishing standards and regulations.

=== 21st-century resurgence ===
Demonstration of jang by the company Sempio

Interest in artisinal jang resurged in the 2000s. Older Koreans recalled the jang they used to eat, and family-run jang businesses saw younger generations returning. As industrial production increased, artisinal jang remained popular for its complex flavor. People across Korea continued to make it at home, though it decreased.

Amid a wave of global interest in Korean culture, a 2007 campaign by South Korea's Ministry of Agriculture, Food and Rural Affairs promoted Korean cuisine internationally. The government aimed for gochujang to become popular in other countries, as kimchi had previously. The company Sempio also launched initiatives to promote jang, presenting the "Jang Pairing Map" to describe its flavors at the 2012 Madrid Fusion conference.

Gochujang became familiar among American chefs in the early 2010s, and the international fast food chain Shake Shack featured gochujang dishes in the 2020s. Jang also became increasingly popular in Korean-American cuisine.

The international popularity of jang increased its cultural significance in Korea. The Korean government supported programs teaching how to make jang in elementary schools. The restaurant Mingles in Seoul, by chef Mingoo Kang, prepared its own jang; its signature dessert, the Jang Trio, consisted of crème brûlée with doenjang, pecans with ganjang, and puffed rice with gochujang. Kang also wrote a 2024 cookbook titled Jang: The Soul of Korean Cooking, which wrote, "among all the ways of enjoying soybeans, jang is the most profound." The nun Sunjae, a popularizer of Korean temple cuisine, described jang as the "source of vitality and immunity" in a 2026 book.

Production of the three main jangs decreased while products made from jang increased, amid a growing demand for convenience food as more Koreans lived alone. The amount of jang produced decreased 5.5% between 2016 and 2020. Doenjang experienced the largest decline, with an uptick in production of ganjang and gochujang.

Production of jang, in tons
Year	Ganjang	Doenjang	Gochujang	Mixed jang	Other jang	Total
2016	360010	98912	135331	89106	35592	718951
2017	257297	97272	130563	95790	38520	619442
2018	308578	92503	131713	95206	36825	664825
2019	312085	93036	134191	107780	37860	684952
2020	304511	89822	141352	102480	41361	679526

Knowledge, beliefs and practices related to jang making in the Republic of Korea
- UNESCO Intangible Cultural Heritage
- Country: Republic of Korea
- Reference: 01975

Inscription history
- Inscription: 2024 (19th session)
- List: Representative

UNESCO added the culture of jang to the Intangible Cultural Heritage list for South Korea in 2024. The listing recognized jang damgeugi, which encompasses the knowledge and process of making jang, rather than the food itself. It was the second listing regarding South Korean food, after gimjang, the culture of kimchi.

== Consumption ==
Jang is a defining element of Korean cuisine and plays a large role in its flavors. It is common because soybeans, salt, and water are very common ingredients, with soybeans being one of the most common crops in Korea. A proverb states, "The taste of food depends on jang," or "Food is only as good as the jang. Another states, "If the jang changes flavor, the family is in trouble."

Jang is the food item with the highest market share in Korea. The most common seasoning in the country is ganjang, followed by gochujang, then doenjang. A 2020 survey of the most consumed foods in South Korea ranked them as the 4th, 17th, and 27th most common foods, respectively. Ssamjang is also common. The typical Korean eats about 8.8 grams of doenjang per day. The consumption of jang and kimchi contribute to high sodium consumption in Korea, while balancing the nutrition of the rice-heavy diet.

Many Koreans make jang at home, comparable to the making of sourdoughs. The ways of making it vary widely and are often associated with family traditions. Some families may store ganjang for decades, to keep it consistent, or they may mix old ganjang into new batches, sometimes going back centuries. The making of jang is usually passed down to women by their mothers and mothers-in-law, while other ways it is taught include schools, universities, and community groups.

In Korea, artisanal producers of jang are primarily women. Different producers' versions of jang vary greatly due to additional ingredients and fermentation conditions, so there are geographic differences. For example, jang produced on Jeju Island is strong and bitter, while jang from Paju has a mild flavor. Mass-produced jang is also common. Producers include Chung Jung One and Sempio.

Beyond Korea, few people are familiar with jang. The most well-known type outside of Korea is gochujang, which is widely exported from Korea and is popular in the Western world. Exports of jang were valued at US$82 million in 2021 (Equivalent to 97 million in 2025), of which 65% was gochujang, 23% was ganjang, and 13% was doenjang.

== See also ==
- Jangdokdae – space for fermenting jang
