= 醬 =

醬 may refer to:

- Jiàng (酱/醬), Chinese sauces and pastes
  - dòubànjiàng (bean paste)
  - hǎixiānjiàng (hoisin sauce)
  - jiàngyóu (soy sauce)
  - tiánmiànjiàng (sweet bean sauce)
- Jang (장/醬), Korean sauces and pastes
  - ganjang (soy sauce) and guk-ganjang (soup soy sauce)
  - doenjang (soybean paste)
  - gochujang (red chili paste)
- Shō (醬/しょう) or hishio (醬/ひしお), Japanese sauces and pastes
  - miso (soybean paste)
  - shōyu (soy sauce)
