= Tojang =

Tojang or Doejang may stand for:

- Doenjang, a traditional Korean fermented soybean paste
- Dojang, a formal training hall in Korean martial arts
- Dojang (device) or Tojang, a seal or stamp used in lieu of signature in several Asian countries
