= Gochujang =

Spicy fermented Korean condiment

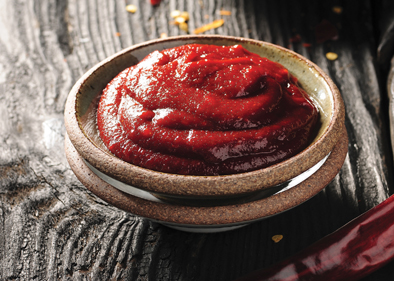
- Alternative names: Red chili paste
- Place of origin: Korea
- Associated cuisine: Korean cuisine
- Main ingredients: Gochu-garu (chili powder), glutinous rice, meju-garu (fermented soybean powder)
- Other information: HS code: 2103.90

Korean name
- Hangul: 고추장
- Hanja: 고추醬
- RR: gochujang
- MR: koch'ujang
- IPA: [kotɕʰudʑaŋ]

Gochujang (Note: UK: /ˈɡoʊtʃuːdʒæŋ, ˈkɔːtʃuːdʒæŋ/ GOH-choo-jang, KAW-choo-jang, US: /ˈɡoʊtʃuːdʒɑːŋ/ GOH-choo-jahng; Korean: 고추장, IPA: [kotɕʰudʑaŋ].) or red chili paste is a savory, sweet, and spicy fermented condiment popular in Korean cooking. It is made from gochugaru (red chili powder), chapssal (glutinous rice), meju (fermented soybean) powder, yeotgireum (barley malt powder), and salt. The sweetness comes from the starch of cooked glutinous rice, cultured with saccharifying enzymes during the fermentation process. Traditionally, it would be naturally fermented over years in jangdok (earthenware) on an elevated stone platform called jangdokdae in the backyard.

== History ==
Shiyi xinjian (食醫心鑑), a mid-9th-century Chinese document, recorded the Korean pepper paste as 苦椒醬 (pinyin: kǔ jiāo jiàng, lit. 'pepper paste'). The second-oldest documentation of pepper paste is found in the 1433 Korean book Collected Prescriptions of Native Korean Medicines. Pepper paste is again mentioned in a 1445 medical encyclopedia named Compendia of Medical Prescriptions. However, all these sources are from the time before the actual chili peppers were introduced to Korea.

Chili peppers (in Korean: 고추 gochu), which originated in the Americas, were introduced to East Asia by Portuguese traders in the early 16th century. There is mention of a type of chili pepper brought to Korea found in Collected Essays of Jibong, an encyclopedia published in 1614. Farm Management, a book from c. 1700, discussed the cultivation methods of chili peppers.

The history of Sunchang gochujang as a regional specialty dates back to the 14th century, at the start of the Joseon Dynasty (1392–1910), when the founder Yi Seong-gye made gochujang from the Sunchang region a part of Korean palace cuisine.

When Yi Seong-gye, who went on to become the founder and first king of Joseon as King Taejo, was on a trip to Manilsa Temple to pray to the mountain god, he is said to have eaten a bowl of barley bibimbab (spicy mixed rice with vegetables) with gochujang that he found unforgettably delicious. He loved it so much that he ordered it served to the royal family when he became king. Thus Sunchang gochujang gained fame as a regional specialty.

In the 18th-century books Somun saseol (소문사설; 謏聞事說) and Revised and Augmented Farm Management, gochujang is written as gochojang, using hanja characters 苦椒醬 and 古椒醬. It is also mentioned that Sunchang County was renowned for its gochujang production. China and Japan, the countries with which Korea has historically shared the most culture and trade, do not include gochujang in their traditional cuisines.

== Historical recipes ==
Gochujang ingredients reported in Jeungbo sallim gyeongje were 18 litres (19 US quarts) of powdered and sieved meju (fermented soybeans), 540 mL (18 1/2 US fl oz) of chili powder, and 1.8 L (1 7/8 U.S. qt) of glutinous rice flour, as well as soup soy sauce for adjusting the consistency. The gochujang recipe in Gyuhap chongseo, an 1809 cookbook, uses powdered meju made from 18 L (19 US qt) of soybeans and 3.6 L (3 3/4 US qt) of glutinous rice, then adding 900–1,260 mL (30 1/2–42 1/2 US fl oz) of chili powder and bap made from 3.6 L (3.8 US qt) of glutinous rice.

== Ingredients ==
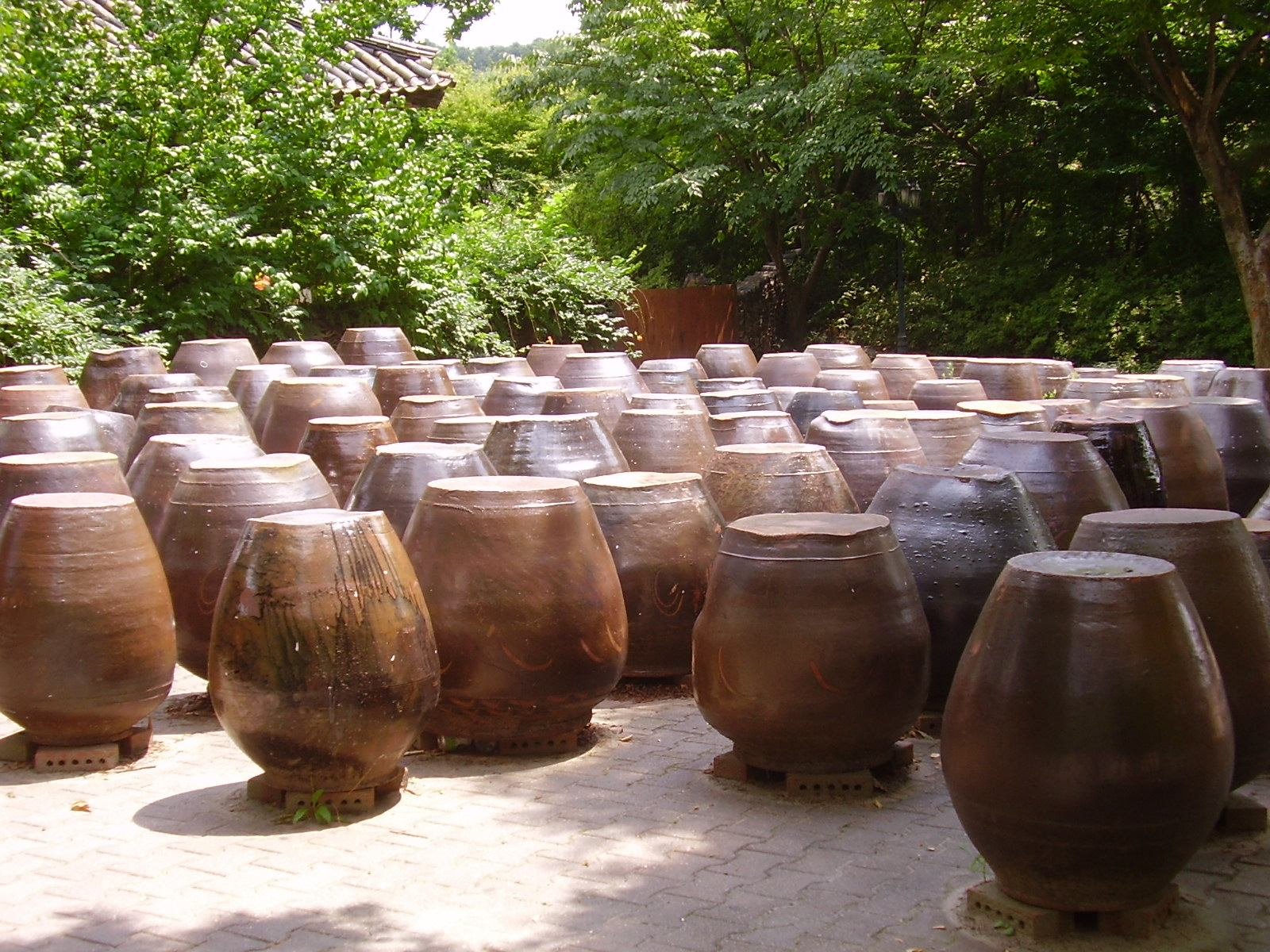
Traditional jars used for fermenting gochujang

Gochujang's primary ingredients are red chili powder (고추가루; gochugaru), glutinous rice powder, powdered fermented soybeans, and salt. Korean chili peppers, of the species Capsicum annuum, are spicy yet sweet, making them ideal for gochujang production. Gochujang is typically made from 25% red pepper powder, 22.2% glutinous rice, 5.5% meju powder (60% cooked soybeans and 40% non-glutinous rice), 12.8% salt, 5% malt, and 29% water.

Other recipes use glutinous rice (찹쌀; chapssal), normal short-grain rice (맵쌀; mepssal), or barley. Less common additions include whole wheat kernels, jujubes, pumpkin, and sweet potato. A small amount of sweetener, such as sugar, syrup, or honey, is also sometimes added. The finished product is a dark red paste, with a rich, piquant flavor.

The making of gochujang at home began tapering off when commercial production came into the mass market in the early 1970s. Now, most Koreans purchase gochujang at grocery stores or markets. It is still used extensively in Korean cooking to flavor stews (jjigae), such as in gochujang jjigae; to marinate meat, such as in gochujang bulgogi; and as a condiment for naengmyeon and bibimbap.

Gochujang is also used as a base for making other condiments, such as chogochujang (초고추장) and ssamjang (쌈장). Chogochujang is a variant of gochujang made by adding vinegar and other seasonings, such as sugar and sesame seeds. It is usually used as a sauce for hoe and hoedeopbap. Similarly, ssamjang is a mixture of mainly gochujang and doenjang, with chopped onions and other spicy seasonings, and it is popular with sangchussam (상추쌈).

== Gochujang hot-taste unit ==
Gochujang hot-taste unit (GHU) is a unit of measurement for the pungency (spicy heat) of gochujang, based on the gas chromatography and the high-performance liquid chromatography of capsaicin and dihydrocapsaicin concentrations.

Gochujang products are assigned to one of the five levels of spiciness: Mild, Slight Hot, Medium Hot, Very Hot, and Extreme Hot.

Extreme Hot	> 100
Very Hot	75–100
Medium Hot	45–75
Slight Hot	30–45
Mild	< 30

== Uses ==
Gochujang is used in various dishes such as bibimbap and tteokbokki, and in salads, stews, soups, and marinated meat dishes. Gochujang may make dishes spicier (depending on the capsaicin in the base chili), but also can make them sweeter and smokier.

== Safety ==
A 2024 study of 35 traditional cottage industry gochujang products found that 8 samples (57% of tested products) exceeded the recommended limit of 4 log CFU/g for Bacillus cereus, a spore-forming bacterium that can produce emetic and diarrheal toxins. The same study also found that 57% of products contained alcohol levels exceeding 1%, which may be relevant for consumers following halal dietary guidelines. However, commercial gochujang produced under standardized manufacturing conditions generally shows lower levels of contamination and alcohol content.

A 2015 survey of Korean fermented soybean products found that 13 of 23 gochujang samples tested positive for Bacillus cereus sensu lato, and all isolates carried at least one enterotoxin gene, though contamination levels did not exceed Korea's regulatory limit of 4 log CFU/g.

A 2024 study detected aflatoxin in certain gochujang samples from different regions of Korea, with levels varying by geographic origin and fermentation conditions. One sample from Hongcheon contained 25.82 ± 0.66 µg/kg of total aflatoxin.

== See also ==
- Doenjang
- Ssamjang
- Chili pepper paste
- Biber salçası
- Filfel chuma
- Harissa
- Awaze
- Jeow bong
- Doubanjiang
- Sambal
- Sriracha
- Yuzukoshō
- Zhug
- Fermented bean paste
- Ají (sauce)
