= Meju =

Fermented soybean bricks

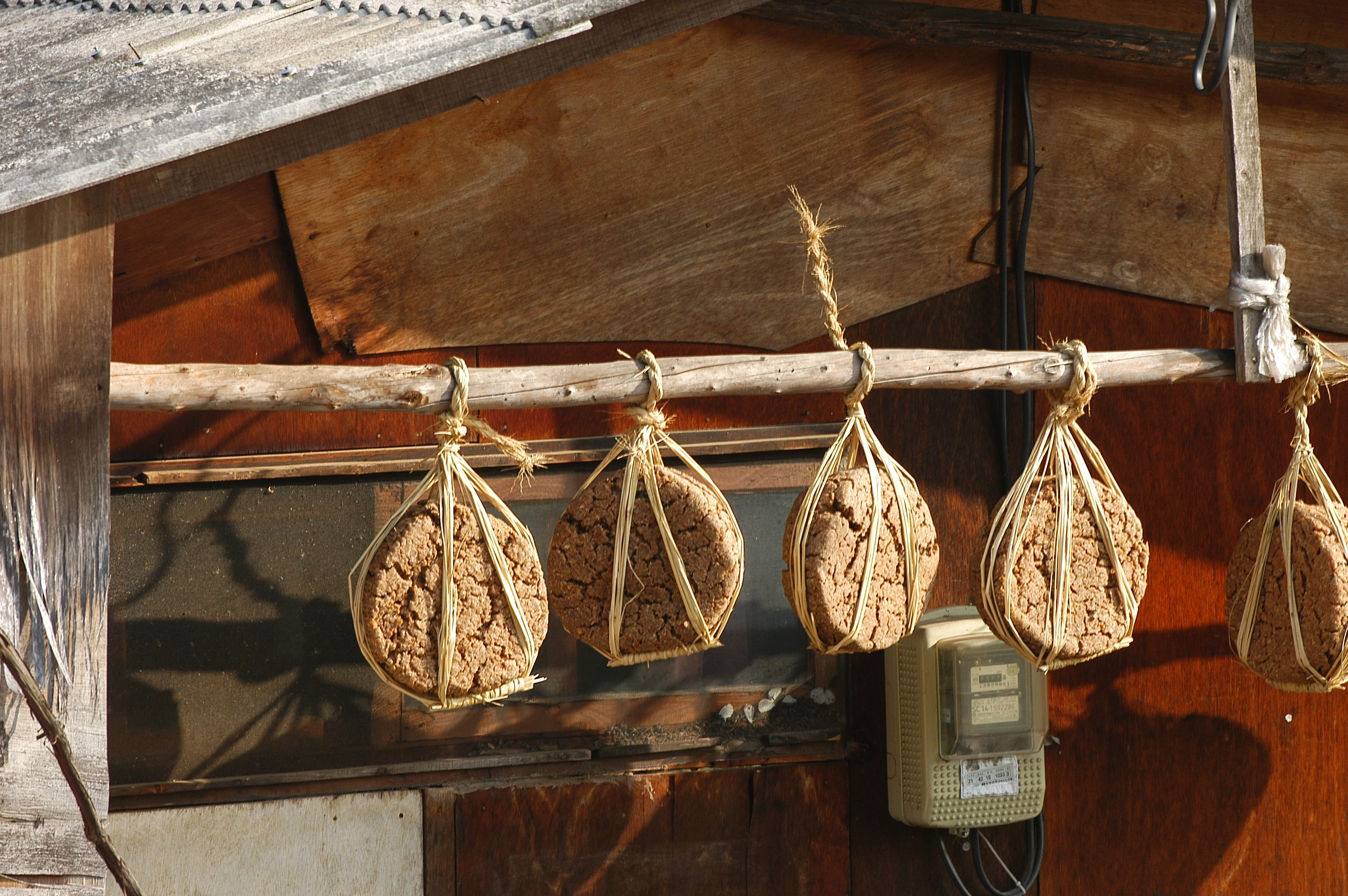
- Air-drying meju, tied with rice straws
- Place of origin: Korea
- Associated cuisine: Korean cuisine
- Main ingredients: Soybeans

Korean name
- Hangul: 메주
- RR: meju
- MR: meju
- IPA: [me.dʑu]

Meju (Korean: 메주) is a brick of dried fermented soybeans. While not consumed on its own, it serves as the basis of several Korean condiments, such as doenjang (soybean paste), ganjang (soy sauce), and gochujang (chili paste). Meju is produced by pounding, kneading, and shaping cooked soybeans, and undergoes fermentation with Aspergillus oryzae and/or Bacillus subtilis.

== Etymology ==
The word meju (메주) is derived from Middle Korean myeyjwo (몌조), which is itself derived from myejwu (며주), as recorded in the 1527 book, Collection of Characters for Training the Unenlightened. Earlier forms transcribed using hanja (Chinese characters) include miljeo (밀저; 蜜沮) as recorded in Things on Korea, a 12th-century book on Korea written by a Song scholar.

== History ==
The custom of fermenting soybeans is assumed to have begun prior to the era of the Three Kingdoms (57 BCE to 668 CE).

The Records of the Three Kingdoms, a Chinese historical text written and published in the 3rd century, mentions that "Goguryeo people are good at brewing fermented soy beans." in the section titled Eastern foreigners, in the Book of Wei. Jangdoks (pots) used for soy sauce brewing are found in the mural paintings of Anak Tomb No.3 from the 4th century Goguryeo.

In the historical text Samguk sagi, meju was reported to be one of the wedding presents offered by King Sinmun in February 683. According to History of Korea, citing the New Book of Tang, meju was also a local specialty of Balhae's Chaekseong region.

The Treatise on Food and Money, a section from the historical text Goryeosa, recorded that ganjang and doenjang were included in the relief supplies in 1018, after a Khitan invasion, and in 1052, when a famine occurred. Joseon texts such as Concise Reference for Famine Relief and Revised and Augmented Farm Management contain the detailed procedures on how to make meju for good quality ganjang and doenjang.

== Preparation ==
Meju is usually made between October and December, typically around ipdong in early November. However, the specific time and the process followed when making meju varies across regions, and depends on which food it will be used to make. Meju for Korean royal court cuisine was made around the fourth month of the lunar calendar, while meju made for home cooking was made around the tenth or twelfth month of the lunar calendar. In Sunchang, meju for gochujang was made around August and September. Traditionally, meju for ganjang and doenjang (which are produced together) are made entirely of fermented soybeans, while meju for gochujang are made using soybeans mixed with rice, barley, or wheat. If wheat is used, the ratio between soybeans and wheat is 6:4; if glutinous rice is used, the ratio between soybeans and glutinous rice is 5:2.

Soybeans are washed, soaked overnight, and cooked. They are usually boiled in a gamasot (cauldron), but can also be steamed in a siru (steamer), for at least three to four hours and usually five to eight hours. Cooked beans are drained in a sokuri (bamboo basket) and pounded in a jeolgu (mortar) while still hot. About 1.8–3.6 litres (0.40–0.79 imp gal; 0.48–0.95 US gal) of pounded soybeans are chunked, compressed, and shaped into a cube or a sphere to form meju. The meju bricks are then dried in a cool shaded area until firm. When the bricks harden, they are tied with rice straws to the eaves of the house for air-drying, during which the rice stalks transfer Bacillus subtilis bacteria to meju bricks. Fungi and bacteria, mainly Bacillus subtilis and various Aspergillus strains, are responsible for the fermentation of meju. Well fermented meju bricks are washed and sun-dried for later use.

== See also ==
- List of fermented soy products
