= Dark soy sauce =

Thick Chinese soy sauce used for color and flavour

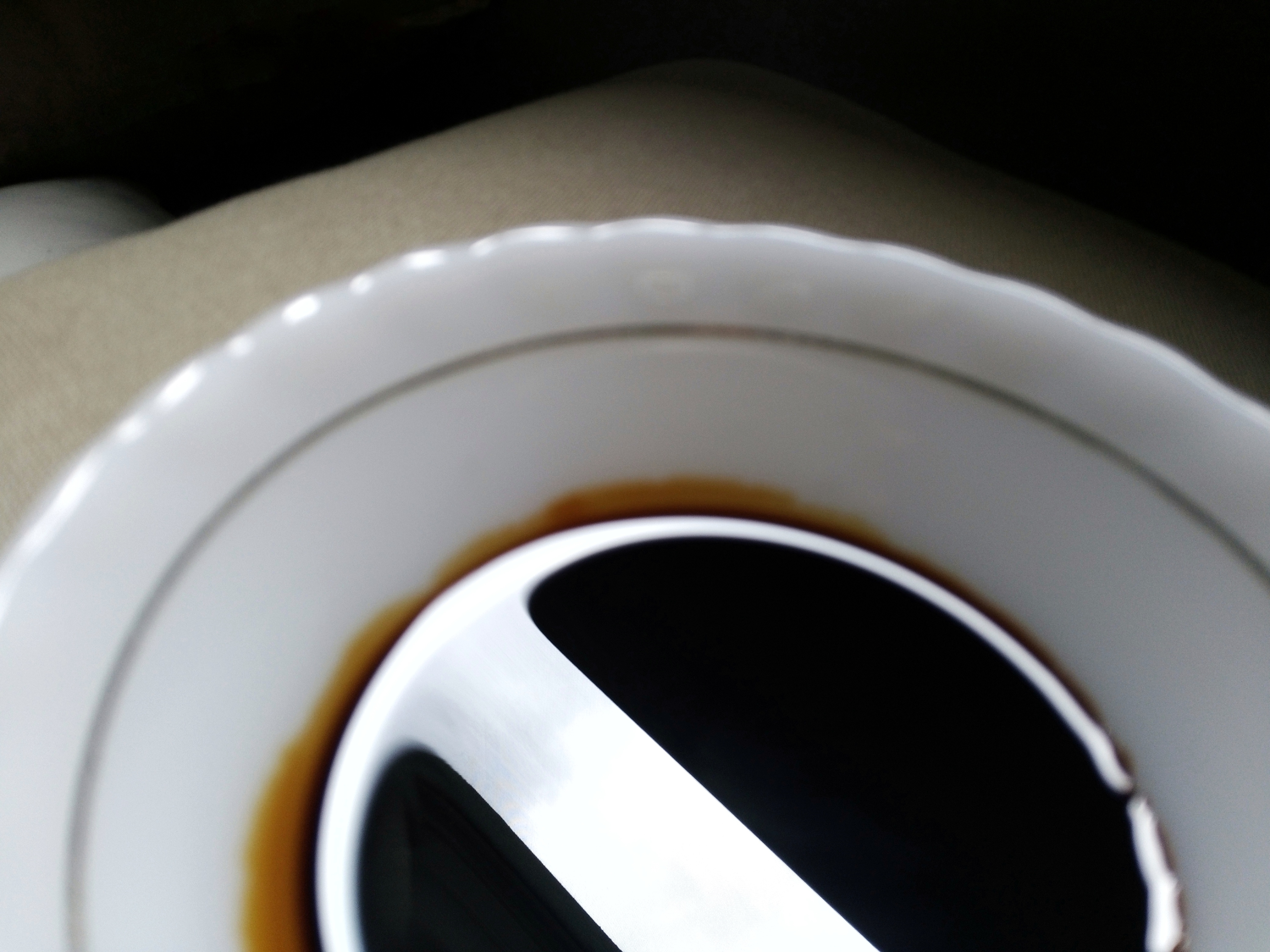
- Type: Soy sauce
- Place of origin: China
- Associated cuisine: Chinese cuisine

In Chinese cuisine, dark soy sauce (Chinese: 老抽; pinyin: lǎo chōu) is a dark-coloured soy sauce used mainly for adding colour and flavour to dishes. It is richer, slightly thicker, and less salty than other types of soy sauce. As the Chinese name lǎo chōu (lit. 'old extract') suggests, it is also aged longer. It is often sweetened by adding molasses or other sweetening agents. Dark soy sauce is often used in stews, stir-fries, and sauces. It is used in dishes requiring colours, such as red-cooked dishes.

== Name ==
Chinese names

Mandarin
- Chinese: 老抽
- Literal meaning: old extract
- Hanyu Pinyin: lǎo chōu
- Bopomofo: ㄌㄠˇㄔㄡ
- Wade–Giles: lao^{3} ch'ou^{1}
- Yale Romanization: lǎu chōu
- IPA: [làʊ.ʈʂʰóʊ]

Cantonese
- Traditional Chinese: 老抽
- Yale Romanization: lóuh chāu
- Jyutping: lou^{5} cau^{1}
- IPA: [lɔw˩˧.tsʰɐw˥]

The Chinese word lǎo chōu (Chinese: 老抽), meaning "old extract", is shortened from the word lǎo tóu chōu (simplified Chinese: 老头抽; traditional Chinese: 老頭抽), meaning "old man extract". It contrasts with shēng chōu (Chinese: 生抽) or "raw extract", usually referred to as "light soy sauce" in English sources.

== See also ==
- Soup soy sauce
- Sweet soy sauce
