= Doenjang =

Korean fermented bean paste

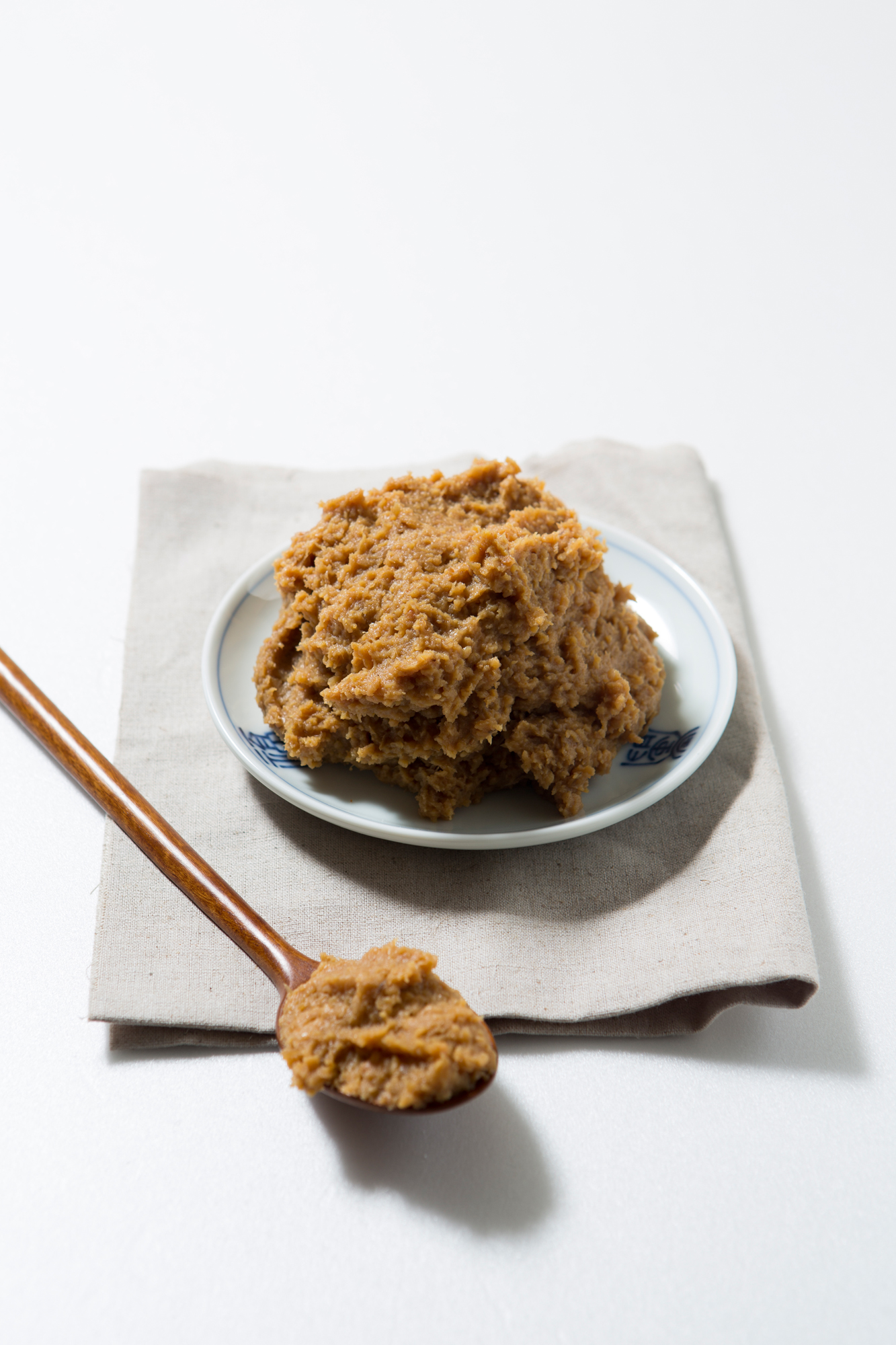
- Alternative names: Soybean paste
- Type: Fermented bean paste
- Place of origin: Korea
- Region or state: East Asia
- Main ingredients: Soybean, brine
- Other information: Brewed along with ganjang

Korean name
- Hangul: 된장
- Hanja: 된醬
- RR: doenjang
- MR: toenjang
- IPA: tøn.dʑaŋ twen.dʑaŋ

Doenjang (Korean: 된장; pronounced [tøn.dʑaŋ, twen-]; lit. 'thick sauce') or soybean paste is a type of fermented bean paste made of soybean and brine used in Korean cuisine. It is also a byproduct of soup soy sauce production. It is sometimes used as a relish.

== History ==
The Records of the Three Kingdoms, a Chinese historical text written and published in the third century CE, mentions that "Goguryeo people are good at brewing fermented soybeans" in the section named Dongyi (Eastern foreigners) in the Book of Wei. Jangdoks used for doenjang production are found in the mural paintings of Anak Tomb No. 3 from the 4th century Goguryeo.

In the Samguk sagi, a historical record of the Three Kingdoms of Korea, it is written that doenjang and ganjang, along with meju and jeotgal, were prepared for the wedding ceremony of King Sinmun in February 683. Sikhwaji, a section from Goryeosa (History of Goryeo), recorded that doenjang and ganjang were included in the relief supplies in 1018, after a Khitan invasion, and in 1052, when a famine occurred. Joseon texts such as Guhwangchwaryo and Jeungbo sallim gyeongje contain detailed procedures on how to brew good-quality doenjang and ganjang. Gyuhap Chongseo explains how to pick a date for brewing, what to forbear, and how to keep and preserve doenjang and ganjang.

== Production ==
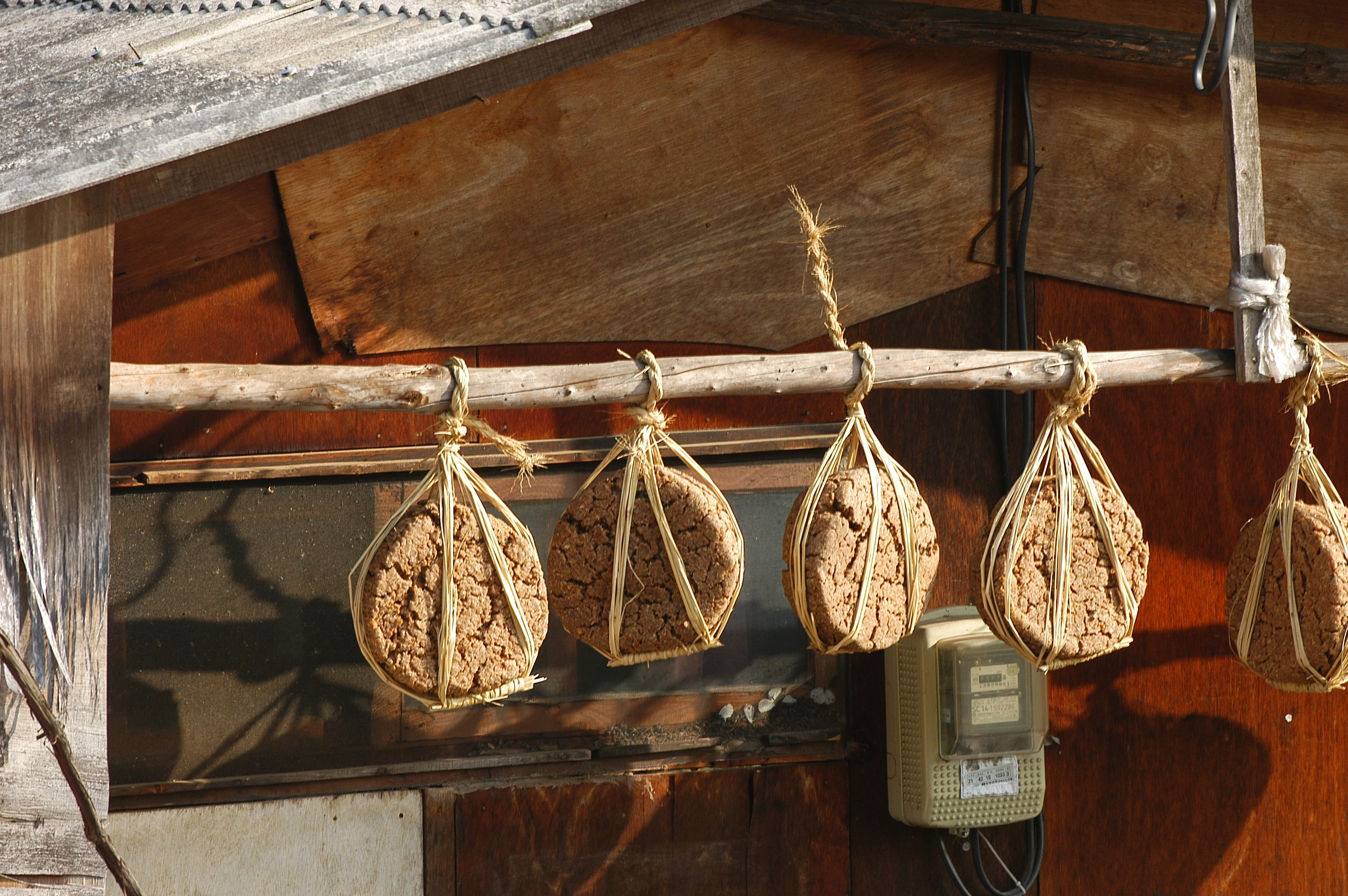
drying meju

Doenjang is made using fermented soybean and brine. Soup soy sauce is also made during the doenjang production.

Meju, Korean soybean brick, is made around ipdong in early November. Soybeans are soaked overnight, boiled in salt water, and then pounded in a mortar (jeolgu) or coarsely ground in a millstone. About a doe (about 1.8 L (110 cu in)) or two does of pounded soybean is chunked, compressed, and shaped into a cube or a sphere called meju. The meju bricks are then dried in a cool, shaded area for a week to several weeks until firm. When the bricks harden, they are tied with rice straws to the eaves of the house, or put in the warm ondol room with rice straws, for fermentation. In Jeongwol, the first month of the lunar year, well-fermented meju bricks are washed and sun-dried.

After drying, the meju bricks are aged in onggi crocks (jangdok) with brine. Charcoal and chillies are added for their absorbent and antibacterial properties, as well as folk-religious beliefs that they drive evil spirits away. When fermented well, the aged meju chunks are mashed to become doenjang, and the filtrate is boiled to become ganjang.

== Types ==
Though doenjang and ganjang are usually made together, doenjang can also be made without producing any filtrate.

- Tojang (토장) – When the aged brine is boiled to become ganjang, the rest (aged meju chunks) are mashed to become tojang.
- Jangjae (장재) – Smaller amount of brine is used from the beginning. No soy sauce is produced in the process, and the meju aged with the smaller amount of brine becomes jangjae, another type of doenjang.

While traditional doenjang is made with soybeans and brine only, many factory-made variants of doenjang contain a fair amount of wheat flour just like most factory-made soy sauce does. Some current makers also add fermented, dried, and ground anchovies to accentuate doenjang's savory flavor. Korean Ministry of Food and Drug Safety's Food Code classifies doenjang into three categories by their ingredients.

- Hansik-doenjang (한식된장, "Korean-style fermented soybean paste") – doenjang made with traditional style meju and brine.
- Doenjang (된장, "fermented soybean paste") – doenjang made with non-traditional meju (which can be made of soybean, rice, barley, wheat or degreased soybean, and ripened using traditional method or Aspergillus) and saline solution.
- Seasoned doenjang (조미된장) – product that contains more than 90% of doenjang or hansik-doenjang.

== Use ==
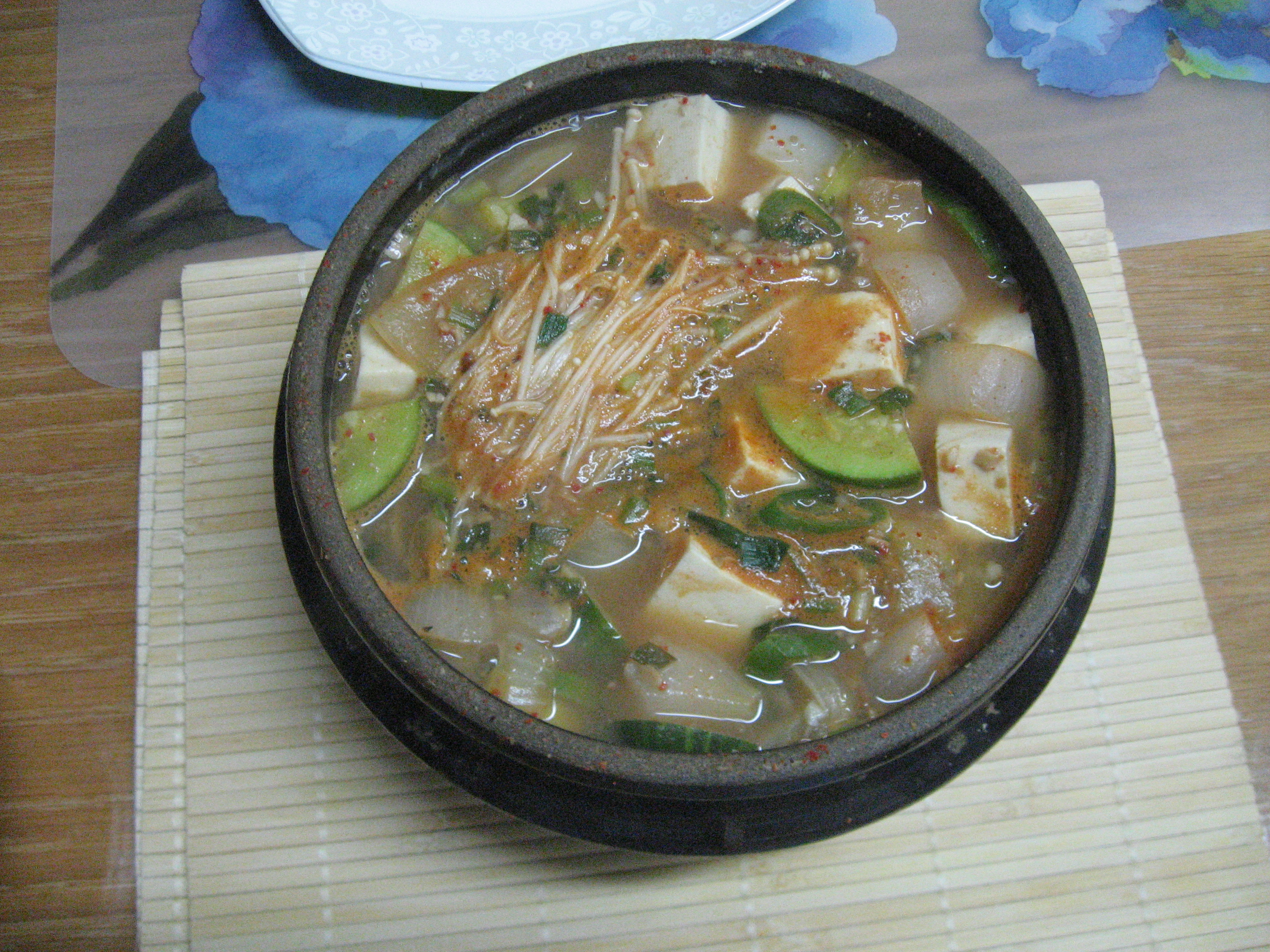
A bowl of homemade doenjang jjigae

Doenjang can be eaten as a condiment in raw-paste form with vegetables, as flavored seasoning or even as a dipping condiment. However, it is more commonly mixed with garlic, sesame oil, and sometimes gochujang to produce ssamjang, which is then traditionally eaten with or without rice wrapped in leaf vegetables such as red leaf lettuce. This dish is called ssambap. This combination of leaf vegetable and doenjang (or ssamjang) often complements popular Korean meat dishes such as samgyeopsal, bulgogi, bibimbap and bossam.

It can also be used as a component of soup broth, as in the popular stew doenjang jjigae, which usually includes tofu, various vegetables such as chile peppers, zucchini, and scallion, and (optionally) mushrooms, red meat, or scallops.

== Nutrition and health ==
Doenjang is rich in flavonoids and beneficial vitamins, minerals, and plant hormones (phytoestrogens) which are sometimes claimed to possess anti-carcinogenic properties. In Korean traditional meals, the menu has concentrated on vegetables and rice, but doenjang, which is made of soybeans, has a great deal of lysine, an essential amino acid that rice lacks. Linoleic acid (53% of the fatty acids) and linolenic acid (8% of the fatty acids) have an important role in normal growth of blood vessels and prevention of blood vessel-related illness. Doenjang's efficacy still exists after boiling, in dishes such as doenjang jjigae.

Claims are being explored about the role of doenjang in reducing visceral fat, though most studies have only been done on rodents. However, one study on humans does exist, which suggests that its visceral fat reduction properties are also present in humans.

== Outside Korea ==
Doenjang is considered one of the essential sauces of authentic Korean cuisine. However, the condiment has historically been unknown outside of Korea, although recent international articles have resulted in an increase in its popularity. A 2007 Chinese article on the "Sauces of Korea" listed doenjang and gochujang as essential flavorings, and explored the origins of the condiments, particularly focusing on Sunchang County, where most Korean soy sauce is produced. The article pointed out that doenjang does not contain any artificial additives and in fact has healthy amounts of essential vitamins, such as vitamin C and vitamin B_{12}. The health benefits of doenjang are rumored to extend longevity, and this is illustrated by the fact that out of the 32,000 people in Sunchang County, eight are over 100 years old, and many are over 90. The article was influential throughout China, resulting in many Chinese restaurants adding doenjang jjigae to their menus shortly after publication. South Korea's JoongAng Ilbo covered this story in China on December 13, 2007.

== In culture ==
"Doenjang girl" is a slang term for women who indulge in luxurious products to show off despite not being able to afford them, and eat low-priced basic food at home.

== See also ==
- Cheonggukjang
- Doujiang, fresh soy milk in Chinese cuisine
- Fermented bean paste
- Korean cuisine
- List of condiments
- List of fermented foods
- List of fermented soy products
- Miso
- Nattō
- Tương
- Yellow soybean paste
