= Ssamjang =

Spicy soybean paste used in Korean cuisine

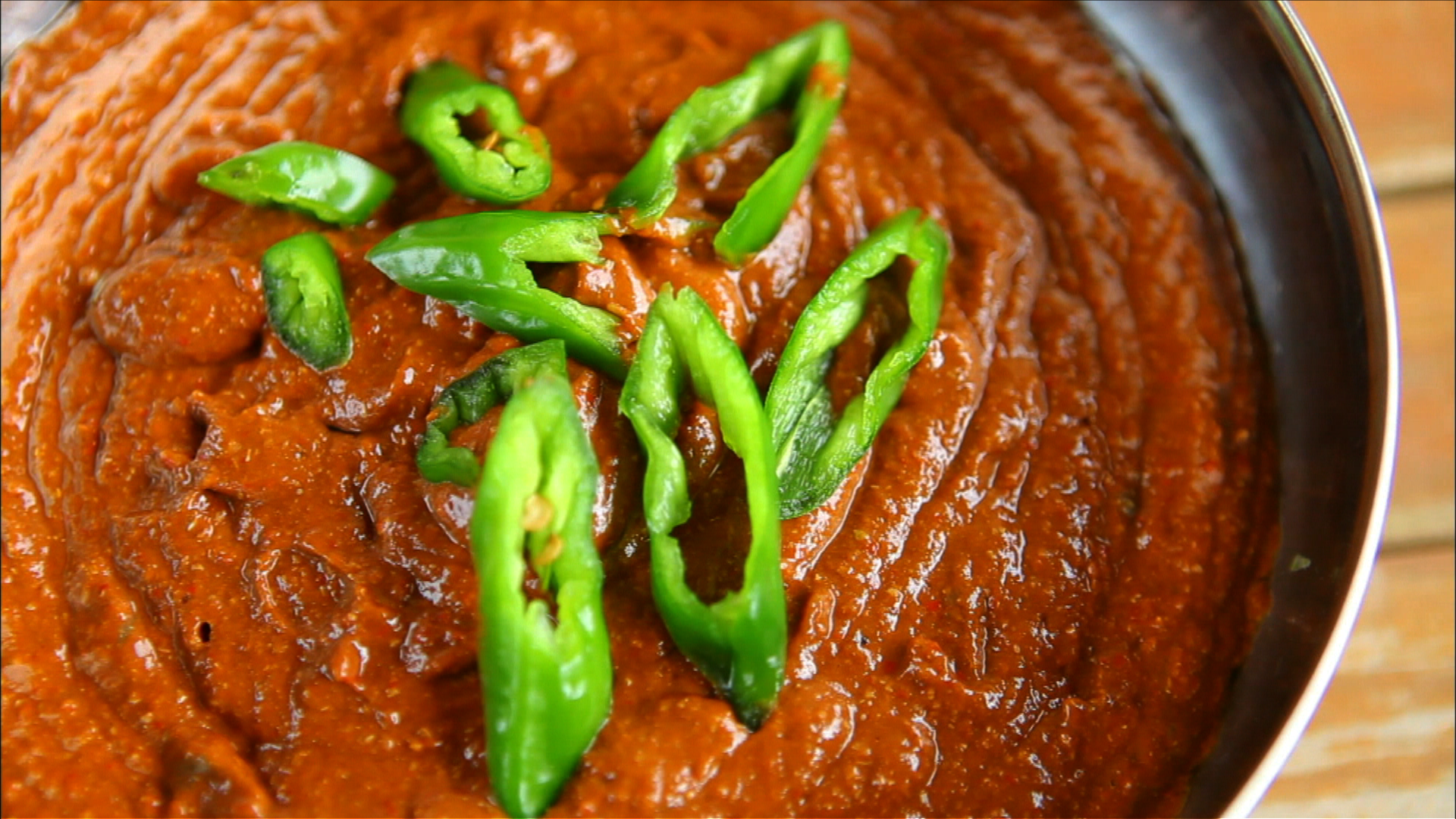
- Type: Condiment
- Place of origin: Korea
- Associated cuisine: Korean cuisine
- Main ingredients: Gochujang, doenjang

Korean name
- Hangul: 쌈장
- Hanja: 쌈醬
- RR: ssamjang
- MR: ssamjang
- IPA: [s͈am.dʑaŋ]

Ssamjang (Korean: 쌈장) is a thick, spicy paste used with food wrapped in a leaf in Korean cuisine. The sauce is made of fermented soy beans (doenjang), red chili paste (gochujang), sesame oil, onion, garlic, green onions, and optionally brown sugar.

== Etymology ==
Ssam means "wrapped" and jang means "paste" or "thick sauce". Together as ssamjang they mean "wrapping sauce".

== Variations ==
Besides the standard way of making ssamjang, other ingredients can be added to make special versions. There are also commercially prepacked ssamjang available on the market.

- Nut ssamjang (견과류 쌈장): ground walnuts, pumpkin seeds, sunflower seeds, and other nuts are added
- Jjukumi ssamjang (쭈꾸미 쌈장): diced short-arm octopus is stir-fried with diced red peppers and onions, and mixed together with ssamjang
- Tofu ssamjang (두부 쌈장): crushed tofu is added
- Flying fish roe ssamjang (날치알 쌈장): flying fish roe is added
- Namul ssamjang (나물 쌈장): various beans are diced and added
- River snail ssamjang (우렁이 쌈장): boil the water with doenjang, river snail, green onion, garlic, and red pepper powder.

== See also ==
- Fermented bean paste
