= Jangdokdae =

Outdoor space for food storage in Korean culture

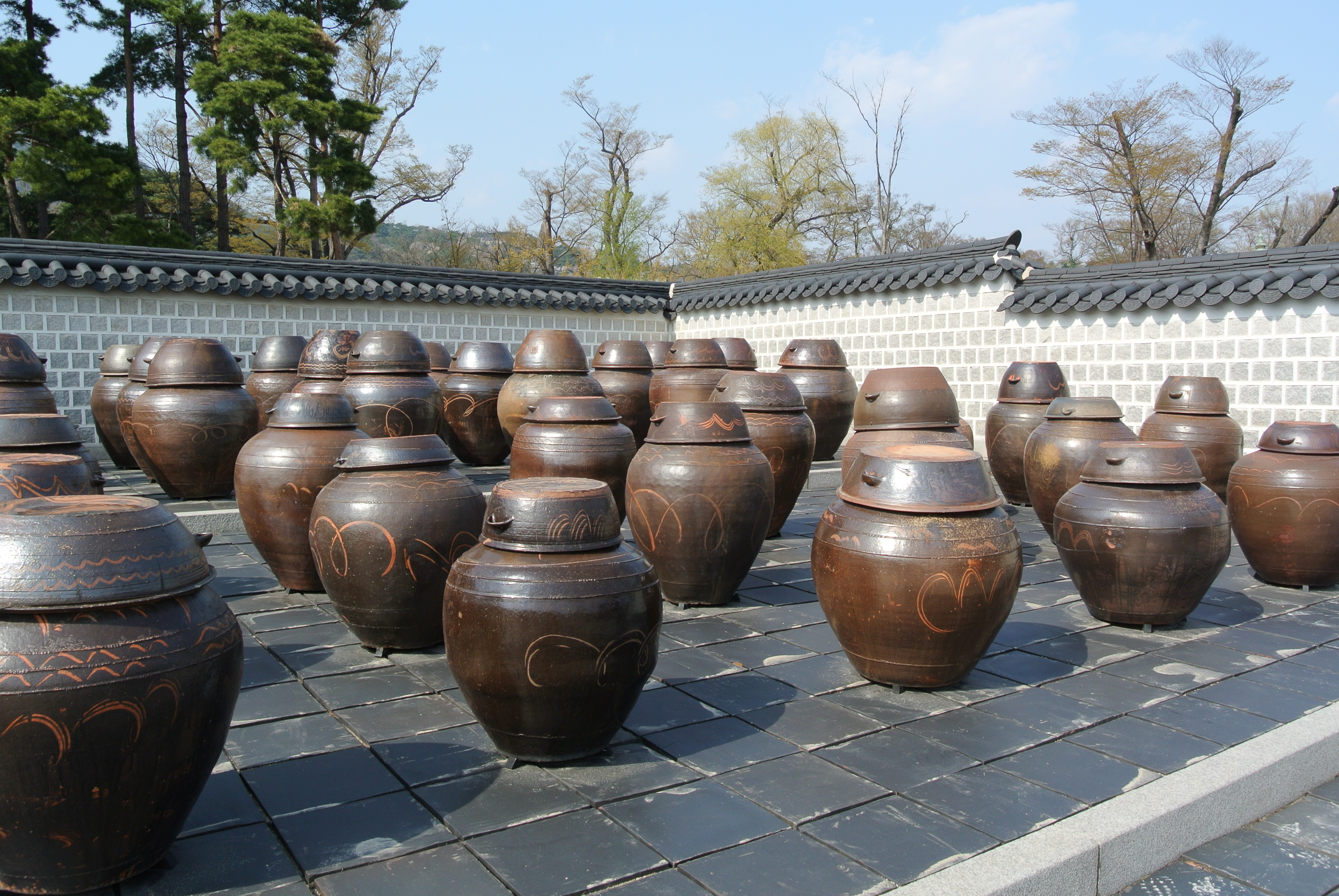
- Jangdokdae at the palace Gyeongbokgung in Seoul

Korean name
- Hangul: 장독대
- Hanja: 醬독臺
- RR: jangdokdae
- MR: changtoktae

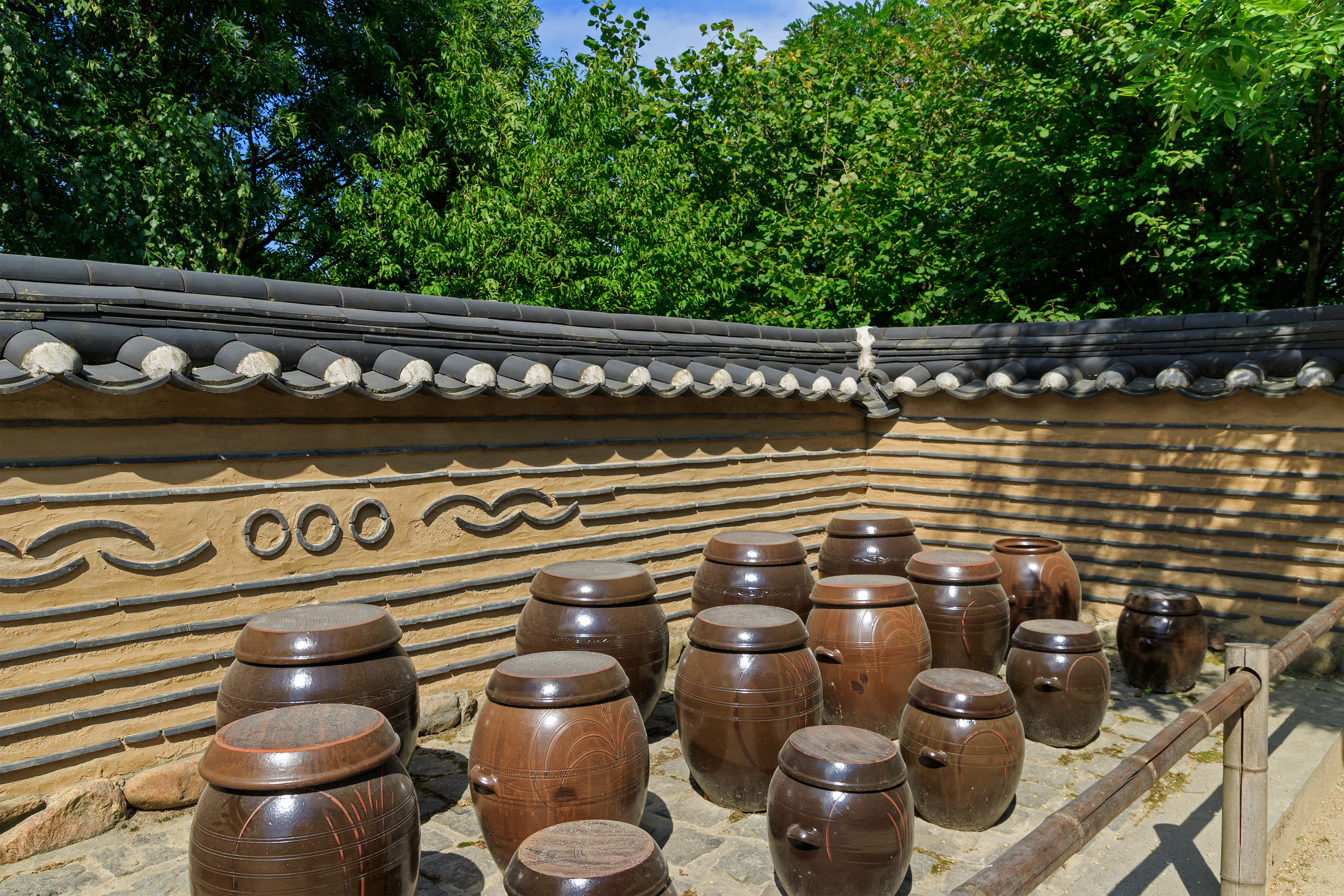
Jangdokdae, Korean garden exhibition, Berlin-Marzahn

In Korean culture, jangdokdae (Korean: 장독대) or jangttokttae is an outside space, most frequently a terrace, used to store or ferment food. Foods such as kimchi, soybeans, grains, and bean and red pepper paste, are placed in jangdok (or onggi) earthenware jars which are then placed on the jangdokdae.

Jangdok (장독) means "crock" (for condiments and soy sauce) and dae (대) means "place" or "support", so jangdokdae (장독대) means "place for jangdok(s)". The jars are called hangari (항아리) or onggi (옹기).

This place is commonly found directly near traditional Korean houses, more precisely near the kitchen. Sunshine and ventilation are key aspects in the location choice, so that foods can be preserved and kept fresh. Well-preserved ingredients may stay for several years in the jars.

The similar terraces of royal palaces were called yeomgo (염고) and were supervised by a court lady, called janggo mama (장고 마마).

== See also ==
- Korean cuisine

- Gochujang
- Teojusin

- Korean pottery

- Onggi
