= Yi Pinghŏgak =

Korean female scholar (1759–1824)

- Hangul: 이빙허각
- Hanja: 李憑虛閣
- RR: I Bingheogak
- MR: I Pinghŏgak

Yi Pinghŏgak (Korean: 이빙허각; Hanja: 李憑虛閣; February 24, 1759 – March 3, 1824) was a Korean female scholar who wrote "Kyuhap ch'ongsŏ" (Encyclopedia of Women's Lives), "Ch'ŏnggyu pangmulji" (Compendium on things by Lady Yi Pinghŏgak), and "Pinghŏgakgo" (A Collection of Poems Translated into Korean) in the late Joseon Dynasty.

== Biography ==
=== Early life ===
Yi Pinghŏgak was born in Seoul, into a yangban family belonging to Jeonju Yi clan. The family was descended from Prince Yŏnghae (영해군), King Sejong's 17th son. Her father, Yi Ch'angsu (이창수; 李昌壽), was the Minister of Personnel (이조판서; 吏曹判書; ijo p'ansŏ), deputy director in the Office of Royal Decrees (예문관제학; 藝文館提學; Yemun'gwan chehak), and deputy director in the Office of Special Advisors (홍문관제학; 弘文館提學; Hongmun'gwan chehak). Her mother was Lady Yu of the Jinju Yu clan, aunt of writer Yu Hŭi who was known for his work Munt'ong (문통; 文通)).

Yi Chang-su married Lady Yu after his first wife died early without children, and Pinghŏgak was their youngest daughter.

The political faction of the family was Soron. Her uncle Yi Ch'angŭi also rose to the position of Right State Councilor. Pinghŏgak had an older brother, Yi Pyŏngjŏng (이병정; 李秉鼎) who was also the son-in-law of Cho Chaeho, who was well-known at the time, and served as the Minister of Personnel and deputy director in the Office of Special Advisors. As such, the Yi family was a prestigious family who served in high-ranking government posts, including her father Yi Ch'angsu, her uncle Yi Ch'angŭi, and brother Yi Pyŏngjŏng.

Yu Han-gyu, Pinghŏgak's maternal uncle, married Yi Ch'ang-sik's daughter, Yi Sajudang, who wrote T'aegyo singi. Although it is not reported now, Pinghŏgak wrote "The Beginning of T'aegyo singi," and "Kyuhap ch'ongsŏ" also contains information on prenatal education, suggesting that Pinghŏgak was influenced by her aunt, Yi Sajudang.

Pinghŏgak was educated by her father, who taught her the Confucian texts of the Classic of Poetry and Elementary Learning. She was renowned for being an educated women, being called by the title of "women scholar" (여사; 女士; yŏsa) as a sign of respect.

=== Married Life ===
Pinghŏgak married Sŏ Yubon (서유본; 徐有本) at the age of 15 in 1782. The two families were married because they had a long acquaintance and were both members of the Soron political faction. Sŏ Yubon was born in Dalseong, and was a descendant of Sŏ Kyŏng-ju, a son-in-law of King Seonjo. Her in-laws produced many literary works on agriculture. Her father-in-law, Sŏ Hŏ-su, wrote the Haedong nongsŏ, or Farming in Korea, and her brother-in-law, Sŏ Yu-gu, wrote the Writings on rural life management.

Pinghŏgak was influenced by the academic traditions of her in-laws after marriage. For example, among Pinghŏgak's works, the Ch'ŏnggyu pangmulji, covers topics on plants and animals. The Kyuhap ch'ongsŏ cites Haedong nongsŏ written by her father-in-law.

Her husband, Sŏ Yubon, had little success with kwagŏ or government posts. After passing the classics licentiate at the age of 22, he applied for higher examination, but repeatedly failed. Moreover, in 1806, his uncle Sŏ Hyŏngsu (서형수; 徐瀅修) was involved in a political dispute and was sent into exile, and the family fell into ruin. At this time, Pinghŏgak was 47 years old.

Pinghŏgak moved her residence to a place called Mapo Administration today as her husband's family collapsed and the family's property tilted. Sŏ Yubon usually stayed inside the house, concentrated on reading. So he naturally spent a lot of time with his wife, Pinghŏgak, discussing his studies and exchanging poems. Writing about this time in the preface of the Kyuhap ch'ongsŏ, Pinghŏgak wrote "I went out to love with my husband in Samho(The Current Location is Mapo) administration and did housework to find all the writings that were needed in daily life and buried in the mountains." Sŏ Yubon's life at the time was unfortunate for himself, but it became a support for Pinghŏgak to expand her studies. Her husband picked the title of her book, naming it Kyuhap ch'ongsŏ. Pinghŏgak had four sons and seven daughters, but eight died early, with only one son and two daughters surviving until adulthood.

== Works ==
Kyuhap ch'ongsŏ

This book had been handed down in manuscripts or woodcuts without knowing when and who wrote it. Then, it turned out to be the first part of the 'Pinghŏgak chŏnsŏ' (A Book Consisting of Three Parts: A Comprehensive Collection of Kyuhap ch'ongsŏ, Ch'ŏnggyu pangmulji, and Pinghŏgakgo) discovered in 1939. Currently, one woodblock book, a manuscript in which two books are tied into one book, etc, a total of 68 National Library books, and a collection of six manuscripts by Jeong Yang-wan are handed down.

The Kyuhap ch'ongsŏ is a collection of the wisdom of a useful life in daily life, as the author states in the preface, "It is truly indispensable for daily life because it is a cure for all first and governance of the family." The contents of the 'Gyuhapchongseo' are divided into Chusaŭi (酒食議), Pongimch'ik (縫紝則), Sangarak (山家樂), Ch'ŏngnanggyŏl (靑囊訣), and Sulsuryak (術數略).

The 'Chusaŭi' section of Kyuhap ch'ongsŏ contains recipes on: making fermented sauce; making alcohol; and making rice, rice cake, fruit juice, and side dishes. 'Pongimch'ik' contains all kinds of miscellaneous goods such as how to make clothes, how to dye them, embroidery, silkworm rearing, how to fix dishes, and turn on lights. 'Sangarak' contains everything necessary for farm life, from how to cultivate fields to how to raise horses, cows, and chickens. 'Ch'ŏngnanggyŏl' contains tips on prenatal education and raising babies, as well as first aid and prohibited emergency medicine. In 'Sulsuryak', there is a description of how to clean up the house and how to chase away the devil with amulets and sorcery.

Kyuhap ch'ongsŏ not only described the contents in detail and clearly, but also wrote the name of the book cited in small letters on each matter. In addition, she added her opinion and called it a 'Sinjŭng', and at the end of each item, the results of her own implementation were revealed in small letters. So it allows people to read and practice. This book is the most read of the kind of cookery handed down in manuscripts. It had a huge impact on our family life.

Ch'ŏnggyu pangmulji

It is a women's encyclopedia written between the late 18th and early 19th centuries. It consists of four volumes.

The Ch'ŏnggyu pangmulji was discovered in 1939, but it was lost around the time of the Korean War. Meanwhile, in early 2004, a team led by Professor Kwon Doo-hwan of Seoul National University rediscovered all four books at the Ogura Collection of the University of Tokyo in Japan.

The first volume contains astronomy and geography, the second volume also contains time and vegetation, the third volume contains a brute and insect, fish and the fourth volume contains contents related to clothing and food. In addition, various materials such as the sun and moon, the sea, tide, alcohol, and calligraphy are recorded in Korean.

== Family ==
- Father - Yi Ch'angsu (이창수; 李昌洙)
- Mother - Lady Yu of the Jinju Yu clan (진주 유씨; 晉州 柳氏)
  - Uncle - Yu Hangyu (유한규; 柳漢奎)
    - Aunt - Yi Sajudang (이사주당; 李師朱堂), Lady Yi of the Jeonju Yi clan (전주 이씨)
      - Cousin - Yu Hŭi (유희; 柳僖; 1773–1837)
- Siblings
  - Older brother - Yi Pyŏngjŏng (이병정; 1742–1804)
- Husband - Sŏ Yubon (서유본; 徐有本; 6 January 1762 – 26 August 1822)
  - Father-in-law - Sŏ Hosu (서호수; 徐浩修; 29 October 1736 – 14 February 1799)
  - Mother-in-law - Lady Yi of the Hansan Yi clan (정부인 한산 이씨; 7 November 1736 – 13 November 1813); daughter of Yi Ijang (이이장)
  - Brother-in-law - Sŏ Yu-gu (서유구; 徐有榘; 1764–1845)
- Issue
  - Son - Sŏ Min-bo (서민보; 30 October 1783–?)
  - Daughter - Lady Sŏ of the Daegu Sŏ clan (대구 서씨; 大丘 徐氏; 1785–?)
    - Son-in-law - Yun Ch'idae (윤치대; 尹致大)
  - Daughter - Lady Sŏ of the Daegu Sŏ clan (대구 서씨; 大丘 徐氏; 1787–?)
