= Onggi =

Type of Korean earthenware

- Hangul: 옹기
- Hanja: 甕器
- RR: onggi
- MR: onggi

Onggi (Korean: 옹기) are earthenware jars extensively used as tableware and storage containers in Korea. The term includes both unglazed earthenware, fired near 600 to 700°C, and pottery with a dark brown glaze fired at over 1100 °C. Onggi have been used continuously from prehistoric Korean states to the modern day; however, they primarily see use as traditional storage and ornaments today. In Korea, onggi are often referred to by size: danji (Korean: 단지) for small jars; hangari (Korean: 항아리) for medium sized jars; and dok (Korean: 독) for large crocks.

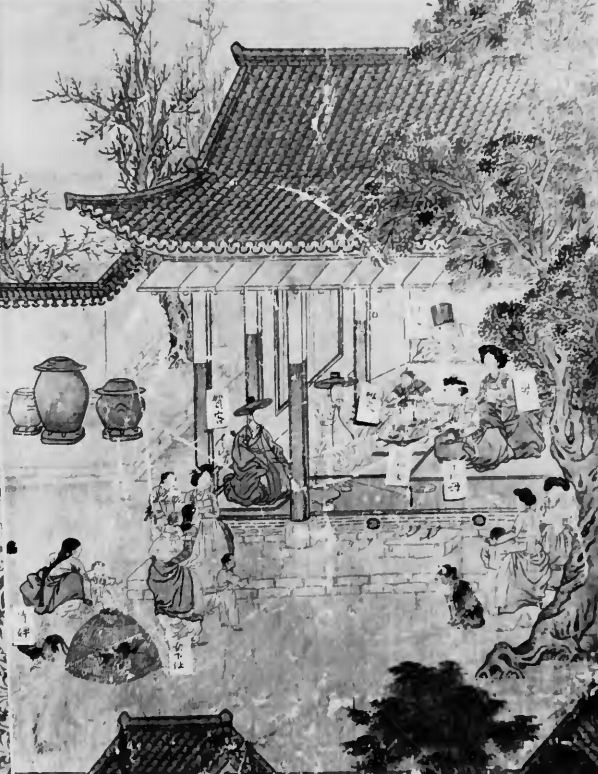
The earliest known painted representations of onggi ware from 1781, in a scene on the panel of A Pictorial Biography of Hong Yi-san, exhibited at the National Museum of Korea.

The origin of onggi dates to around 4000 to 5000 BCE. The types of earthenware include patternless, mumun, and a red-and-black variety. The patternless earthenware is made with lumps of clay and fine sand. The predecessor of Goryeo celadon and Joseon white porcelain, the black/red earthenware excludes any sand in its creation process. The earthenware's color is determined by both the iron content of the clay and the method used to fire it. The modern onggi shape dates back from the Joseon era.

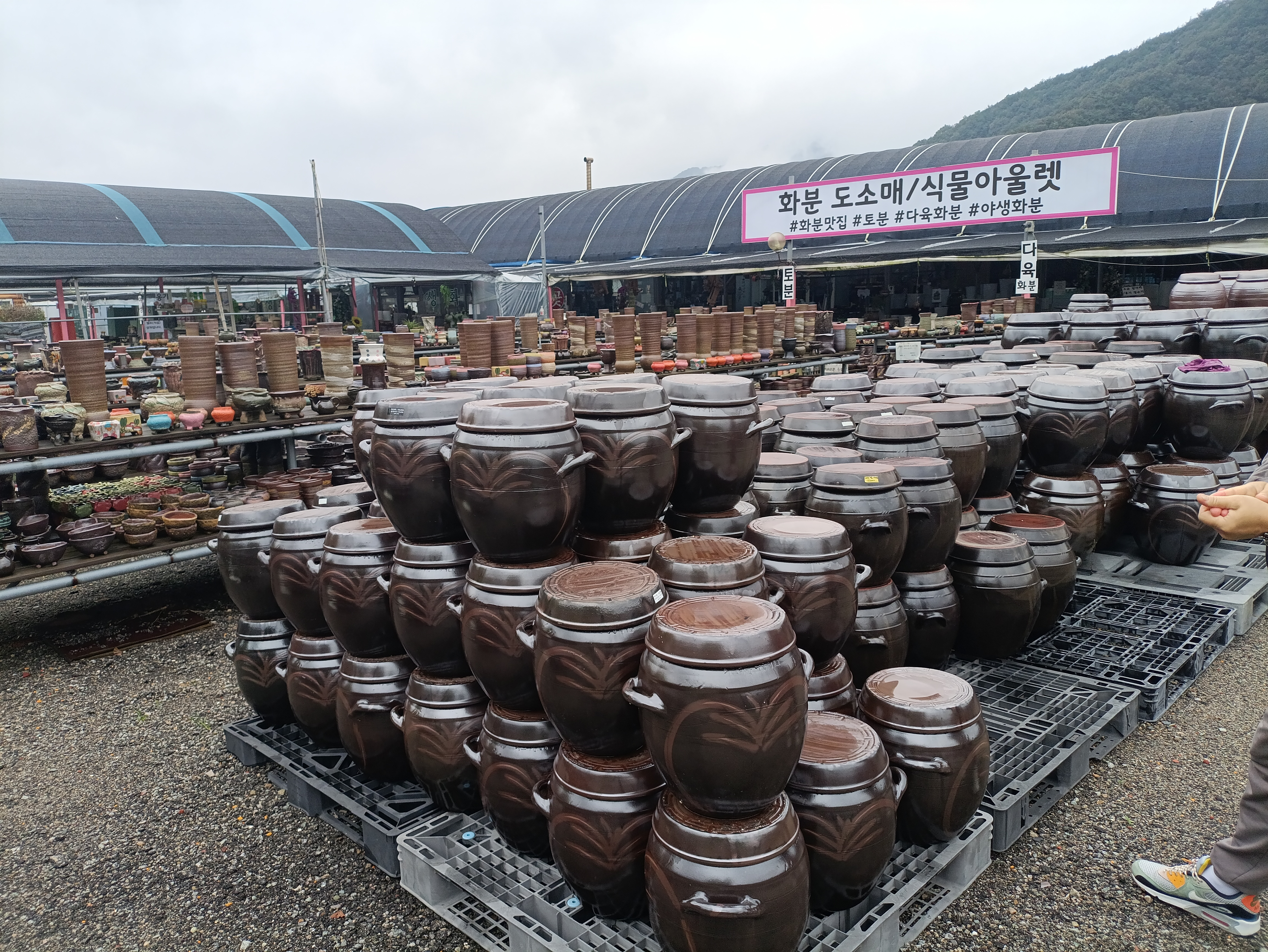
Onggi clay pots Jeonju, Korea

== History ==
Ong (옹; 甕, 瓮) refers to a clay jar.

Pottery has been used on the Korean peninsula since prehistoric times for food storage. In the Three Kingdoms period, images of large and small pottery appear on the murals of Anak Tomb No. 3 in Goguryeo, and in Baekje and Silla. Records indicate that they were used to store rice, liquor, oil, soy sauce, and salted fish. Onggi was also commonly used to preserve drinking water. According to the historical text Kyŏngguk taejŏn, during the early Joseon period, there were 104 onggi craftspeople (옹장) in fourteen institutions, including Bongeunsa.

Many records about onggi are found in Sejong Sillok Jiriji (세종실록지리지, "King Sejong's Treatise on Geography"), which includes further details about Korean pottery: "There are three kilns that make the yellow onggi in Chogye-gun and Jinju-mok, Gyeongsang Province".

Korea has long been known for its fermented foods made in onggi. A passage from the Records of the Three Kingdoms reads: "Goguryeo people have a custom of making fermented foods".

== Uses ==
Onggi has a more microporous structure than porcelain. This feature facilitates fermentation of food. Food commonly made in onggi includes gochujang, doenjang, kimchi, and soy sauce. With proper porosity and permeability, onggi can give an optimally ripe quality to fermented foods. Fine-tuned onggi containers are highly suitable for various kinds of fermented products.

The abundance of soybeans, which grow naturally in Korea, fresh resources from the sea surrounding the Korean Peninsula, and a proper climate for microbial development all play a significant factor in the importance and usage of fermentation for food processing. The development and refinement of onggi ware contributed to the development of fermented dishes in Korean cuisine. Large onggi ware were typically stored on a jangdokdae, an elevated floor near the house.

== Features ==
Onggi are made by a specialized group of workmen called onggijang (Korean: 옹기장). The design of the pots is influenced by the characteristics and climate of the regions in which they are made. As a result, the shape, size, and manufacturing method of onggi vary from region to region. Nevertheless, onggi types share similarities: biodegradability, porosity, resistance to rot, and firmness or "vertebration". Due to the low firing temperatures often used in producing onggi, they are archaeologically rarely found as the shards eventually return to its former clay state or are used as grog. Features of onggi include its breathability, stability, suitability for fermentation, economical price, porosity, and diverse usage.

=== Suitability for fermentation ===
The most significant characteristic of Korean cuisine is its use of fermented food, utilizing onggi pots for the fermentation process. Other foods and items can also be stored in containers originally meant for fermentation, such as tobacco, candlesticks, and cooked rice.

Since the materials to make onggi can be easily and cheaply obtained, onggi has traditionally retailed at a low price, making it obtainable for the lower and middle class.

=== Porosity ===
Before firing, the onggijang (onggi craftsperson) glazes its surface. This glaze plays a key role in providing a waterproof surface and preventing leaks. Additionally before firing a large amount of sand particles are added to the body of the clay, acting as passages for air. This way, air but not water can pass through the pottery. Koreans describe this phenomenon as "onggi breathing". This property contributes to its widespread use in making fermented foods.

=== Variety of usage ===
While onggi are mainly used as food containers, they can also be used to store household appliances such as lamps, fireplaces, ashtrays, coins, ink pads, and ceremonial instruments and percussion instruments such as cans, onion jugs, and wind instruments.

== Production method ==
Onggi pots are made of clay that contains a high percentage of iron. First, the soil to make the pottery is put into the water and whipped out to remove sand and impurities. Once the water is removed from the resulting fine sediment, it is formed into a bowl which is then dried out in the sun. The potter dries the dried-up bowl again in the sun, washes it with a lye solution, then dries it again. The glaze that will be applied to the bowl is mixed with various substances before being sifted through a sieve. After the glaze is applied to the bowl, an orchid or grass pattern is drawn on the body and the pot is air-dried thoroughly, baked in a kiln, and finished.

Another process of making onggi is to first knead the soil, dry it in the shade, cut it with a tool to form a brick shape, and then smack it on the ground into a plank shape. This is referred to as Panzhangjil (판장질). Afterwards, it is placed onto a wheel and ironed (batting) with a Ddukmae (떡매). The shape of the onggi is determined by the speed and hand movements of the wheel. Since the pottery culture seemed likely to disappear after the 1960s, due to the appearance of plastic and stainless steel bowls, the Ministry of Culture designated the onggi Human Cultural Property in May 1989. In 1990, onggijang (onggi craftsperson) was designated as Intangible Cultural Heritage No. 96.

== See also ==
- Korea tradition
- Korean pottery and porcelain
- Earthenware – Nonvitreous pottery
- Jangdokdae – Outdoor space for food storage in Korean culture
- Korea – Region in East Asia
- Pithos – Ancient Greek storage container
