= Kyuhap ch'ongsŏ =

Compendium of advice for women, written during the Joseon Dynasty

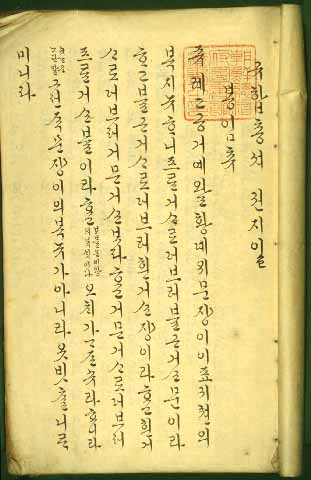

Korean name
- Hangul: 규합총서
- Hanja: 閨閤叢書
- RR: Gyuhap chongseo
- MR: Kyuhap ch'ongsŏ

Kyuhap ch'ongsŏ (Korean: 규합총서; Hanja: 閨閤叢書), or Encyclopedia of Women's Lives, is a compendium of advice for women, written by Yi Pinghŏgak in 1809 during the Korean Joseon Dynasty.

== Composition ==
- Chusaŭi (酒食議) : making jang (condiments), alcoholic beverages, bap (rice dish), tteok (rice cake), yugwa (fried puffed rice snack), banchan (small dishes), among others.
- Pongimch'ik (縫紝則) : making clothing, a process of dyeing, weaving, embroidery, sericulture, soldering dishware, lightening.
- Sangarak (山家樂) : farming, gardening, raising livestock
- Ch'ŏngnanggyŏl (靑囊訣) : taegyo, methods of childrearing, knowledge of first aid and medicine to be avoided
- Sulsuryak (術數略) : knowledge of choosing a house, talismans, folkloric ways to drive away evil spirits.

== See also ==
- Siŭijŏnsŏ
- Sallim kyŏngje
- Sarye p'yŏllam
