= Chŭngbo sallim kyŏngje =

18th-century Korean book on agriculture

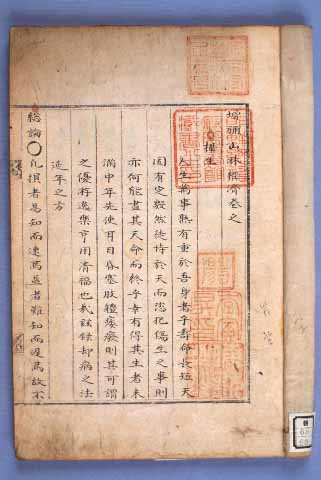

Korean name
- Hangul: 증보산림경제
- Hanja: 增補山林經濟
- Revised Romanization: Jeungbo sallim gyeongje
- McCune–Reischauer: Chŭngbo sallim kyŏngje

Chŭngbo sallim kyŏngje is a Korean book on agriculture compiled by Yu Chungnim (柳重臨) as revised and enlarged from the Sallim kyŏngje written by Hong Mansŏn (洪萬選 1643~1715). Yu Chungnim was a physician during the reign of King Yeongjo (1724–1776) of the Joseon Dynasty and completed writing the manuscript book in 1766. It consists of 16 volumes in 12 books. The title is loosely translated into "Revised Farm Management".

== See also ==
- Siŭijŏnsŏ
- Chibong yusŏl
- Sarye p'yŏllam
