= Sikkimese cuisine =

Traditional foods eaten in Sikkim, India

Sikkimese cuisine is a collection of dishes representative of the Indigenous peoples of Sikkim. Rice is the staple food. Millet and fermented foods traditionally constituted a significant portion of the cuisine.

Nepalese cuisine is popular, as Sikkim is the only state of India with an ethnic Nepali majority. Many restaurants in Sikkim serve various types of Nepalese cuisine, such as the Limbu, Newa and Thakali cuisines. Tibetan cuisine has also influenced Sikkimese cuisine.

== Influences ==
=== Communities ===
The Lepchas and Limbus are the earliest inhabitants of Sikkim who probably arrived in the 13th century CE. The Bhutia people from Tibet arrived later and established the Kingdom of Sikkim. During the British colonial rule in India, labourers from Nepal were encouraged to settle in the state. For many decades now, they have become the largest ethnic group in Sikkim. The British also encouraged Marwaris and Biharis to settle for trade and labour. The cuisine of these communities, with variations to incorporate local realities and availability, is considered Sikkimese cuisine.

=== Ecology ===
Sikkim is part of the Eastern Himalayas Biodiversity hotspot.

Traditional cuisines of the Lepcha, Limbu, Magar, and Bhutia peoples in the state incorporate the rich biodiversity of the region. The Buddhist saint Padmasambhava, also known as Guru Rinpoche, who passed through ancient Sikkim in the eighth century noted the rich produce of the place in his writings,

There are about 155 varieties of fruits with different tastes and nutritional values. [These include] a walnut that tastes like butter; a fruit known as wallay … and a grape with the taste of wine. There are fruits called tingding with the taste of meat, and sedey, which can be eaten as the equivalent of an entire meal; turnips, and thirty-seven other types of root vegetables are available. There are twenty different varieties of garlic. Altogether, among the edible plants, there are 360 varieties available. There are wild radishes, along with tsolay, nyolay, and grapes in the valley. In the trees, among the rocks and hanging from the cliffs there are beehives.

Sikkim is also part of the Kangchenjunga Landscape which spreads from Nepal, India to Bhutan.

=== Trade ===
Sikkim lied on the ancient Silk Road connecting China via Tibet. Centuries of inter-kingdom trade relations and commerce, migration, and political annexation emerging from the road has influence the state's cuisine. British colonial and Indian post-colonial culture has also influenced local food cultures.

== Agriculture ==
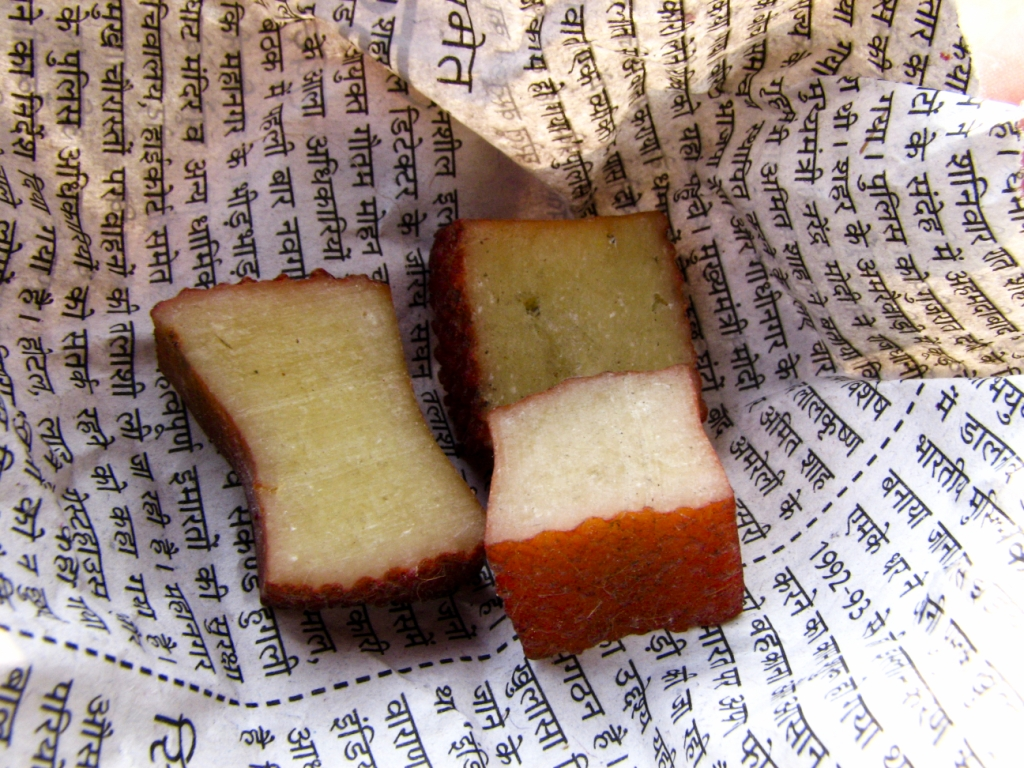
Chhurpi

The geography and modes of food production within Sikkim inform the food culture within the state. The economy of Sikkim is largely agrarian. Due to the state's mountainous terrain, much of the land is unsuitable for farming, so terrace farming, particularly of rice, is common. In addition to rice, other cereal crops cultivated in Sikkim include wheat, maize, barley, and millet. Potatoes, ginger, oranges, tea, and cardamom are also cultivated. Sikkim produces the most cardamom of any Indian state, about 4200 tons annually. Vegetables commonly grown include tomatoes, broccoli, and iskus.

Although dairy and, to a lesser extent, meat and egg products are common elements of the Sikkimese diet, livestock primarily plays a subsidiary role in Sikkim's agricultural sector. Cattle, sheep, goats, pigs and yaks are raised. 11.7% of people in the rural areas of Sikkim are vegetarian.

In 2016, Sikkim became India's first "organic state" after fully converting its agricultural land to sustainable farming practices.

== Fermented foods and common dishes ==
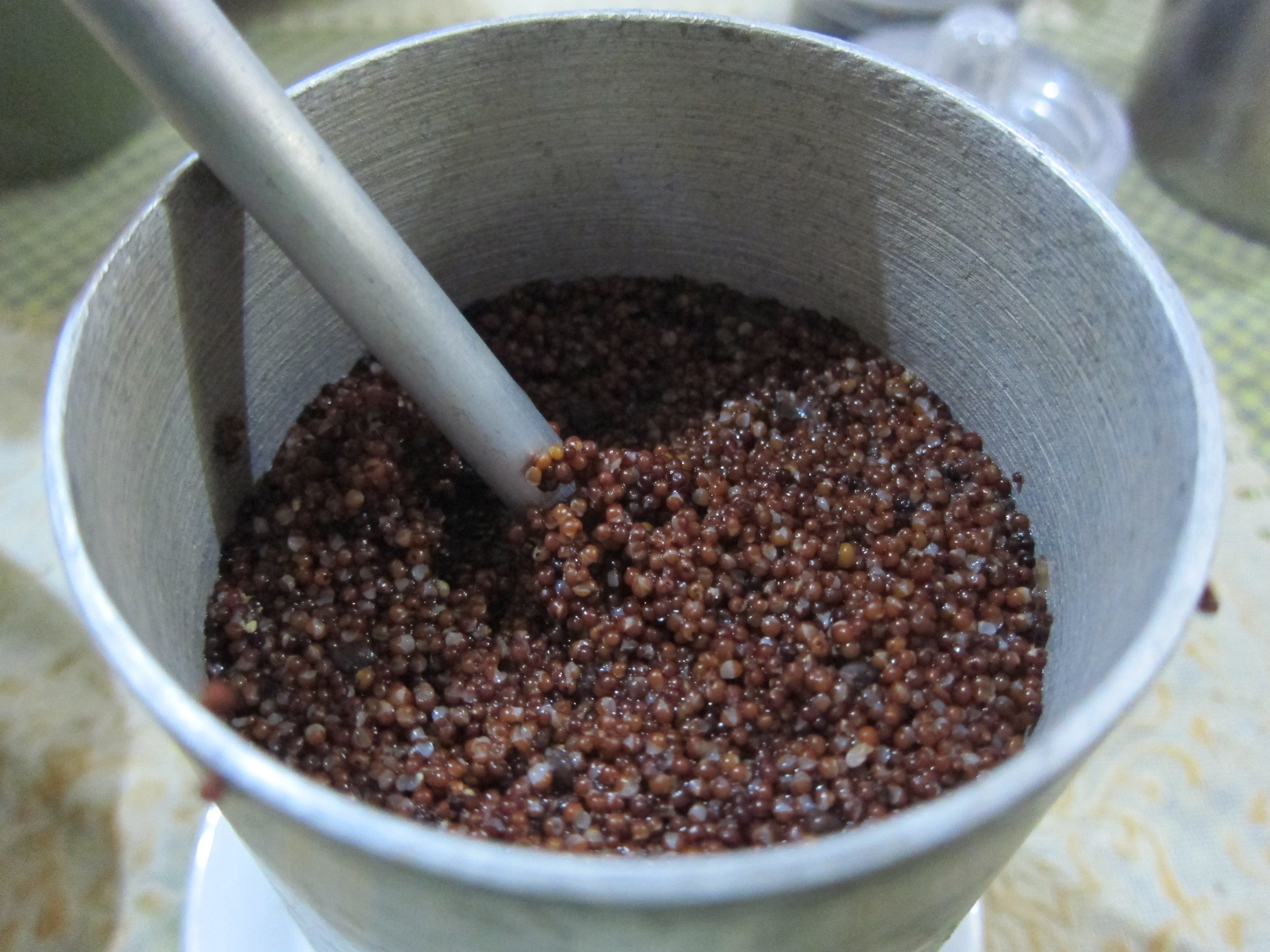
Tongba is a Sikkimese drink made from fermented millet: warm water is added to the millet and the liquid is consumed.

Fermented foods are an integral part of Sikkimese cuisine, comprising 12.6% of total food consumption in the state. Polling indicates that 67.7% of Sikkimese people prepare fermented foods at home rather than purchasing them. This suggests that most fermentation is done at the household level with the notable exceptions of chhurpi and marchaa (a starter culture for fermentation), which are purchased in markets.

Various fermented alcoholic beverages are produced by the introduction of marchaa to cereal grain and subsequent saccharification and fermentation in an airtight vessel. Millet, rice, and maize are commonly used. The grain is washed, cooked, combined with marchaa, then saccharified in an earthware pot for about 1–2 days, then fermented for 2–8 days. Examples of traditional fermented foods are kinema, gundruk, sinki, maseura, and khalpi. Traditional fermented beverages include chyang, tongba, raksi, and kodo ko jaanr.

=== Dishes ===
Sikkimese meals typically follow a bhat-dal-tharkari-achar (rice-pulses-curry-pickle) pattern.

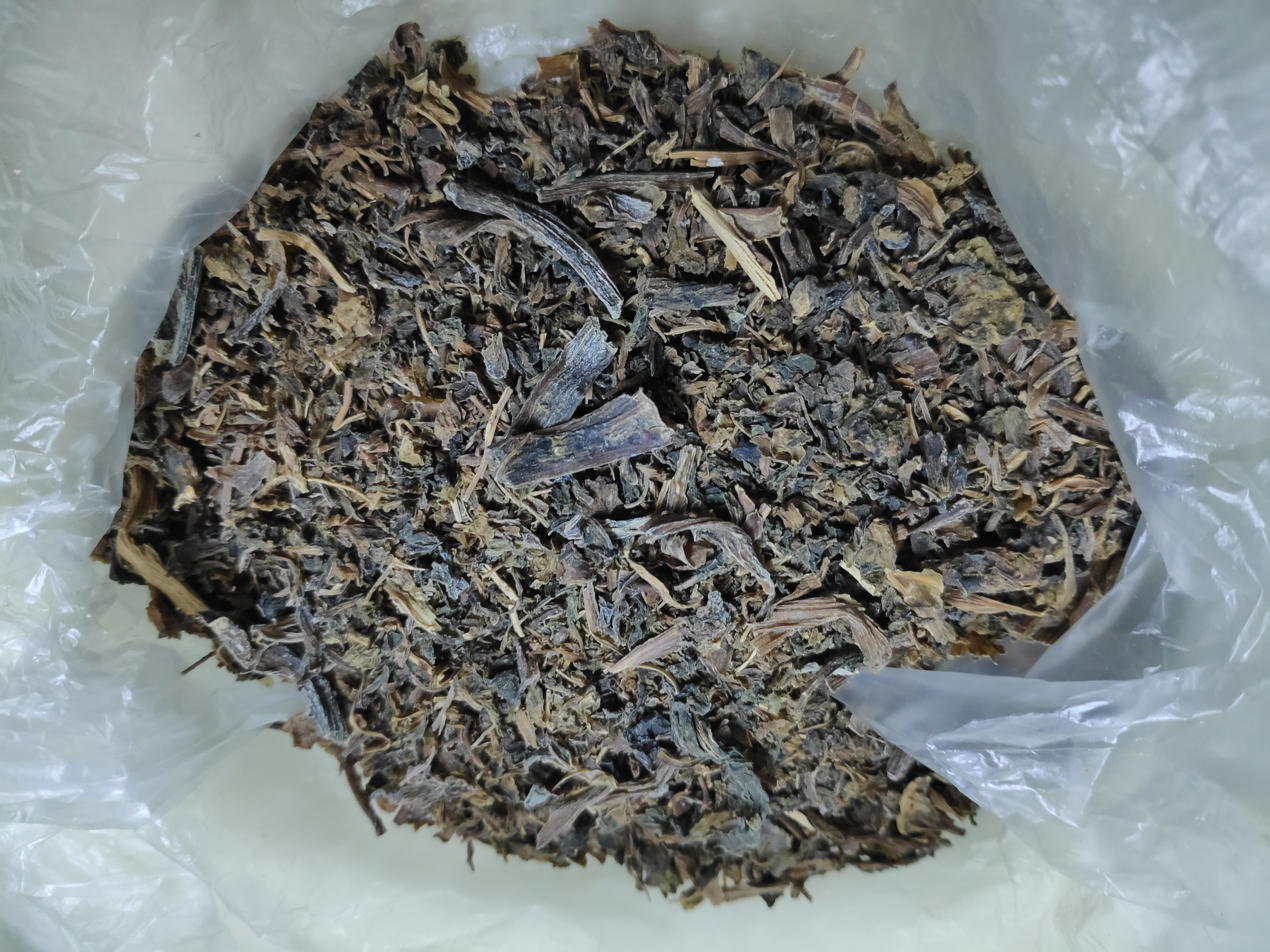
Gundruk (pickled leafy vegetables)

| Name | Description |
|---|---|
| Chhurpi | Traditional Himalayan cheese made from buttermilk. Two varieties of chhurpi exist, one being a soft variety that is usually eaten as a side dish, and a hard variety that is chewed. |
| Dal bhat | Boiled rice and pulses. It is often cooked with onion, garlic, ginger, chili, tomatoes, or tamarind and served with a vegetable tarkari. |
| Dhindo | Nepalese meal prepared by gradual addition of flour to boiling water. |
| Gundruk | Nepalese fermented leafy green vegetable. Surplus mustard, radish, and cauliflower leaves are gathered, shredded, then sealed in an earthenware pot and stored in a warm place. |
| Kinema | Nepalese fermented soybean dish, traditionally combined in a soup with rice, but sometimes served as a side dish with rice or bread. |
| Momo | Steamed dumpling popular throughout the Himalayas. It is stuffed with minced meat or vegetables like chayote or cabbage in a roll of dough and then steamed. It is eaten with vegetable or meat soup and tomato achar. |
| Phagshapa | Nepalese dish of strips of pork fat stewed with radishes and dried chillies. |
| Sel roti | Nepalese rice bread which is ring-shaped and sweet to taste. It is commonly prepared during the Dashain and Tihar festivals. |
| Sinki | Nepalese fermented vegetable prepared by shredding radish roots and storing them for about a month in a sealed hole. |
| Shabhaley | Tibetan bread stuffed with seasoned beef and cabbage. |
| Thukpa | Tibetan noodle soup with vegetables or meat. |
| Tuk-tok | Lepcha porridge made from local rice, especially during Losoong Festival celebrated during December–January marking the Lepcha New Year. It can be vegetarian as well as with meat. |
