= Mixed rice dish =

Food

There are many mixed rice dishes in cuisines around the world. Mixed rice combines rice with various meats, vegetables, and spices. It may be the main dish or a side dish of a meal.

== Global ==
- Rice pudding (sweet)

== North America ==
- Jambalaya (Louisiana)
- Hoppin' John (Southern United States)
- Rice and peas (Caribbean)

== South America ==
Latin American cuisine offers many types of mixed rice dishes:

- Arroz con pollo
- Arroz con gandules
- Gallo pinto
- Pabellón criollo
- Platillo Moros y Cristianos
- Rice and beans
- Spanish rice (Mexico)

== Africa ==
- Bariis iskukaris (Somalia)
- Jollof rice (West Africa)
- Kushari (Egypt)

== Asia ==
- Arroz a la valenciana (Philippines)
- Bibimbap (Korea)
- Biryani and pilaf, pilav, pilau, pullau, etc.: various forms exist in South Asia, Central Asia, and the Middle East
- Bisi bele bath (India)
- Donburi (Japan)
- Economy rice (Southeast Asia)
- Fried rice (East Asia)
- Galho (Nagaland, India)
- Kabsa (Saudi Arabia)
- Khichdi (India)
- Nasi kebuli (Indonesia)
- Nasi uduk (Indonesia)
- Nasi goreng (Indonesia)
- Pongal (India)
- Takikomi gohan (Japan)

== Europe ==
- Arroz de cabidela (Portugal)
- Ghapama (Armenia)
- Insalata di riso (Italy)
- Kedgeree (United Kingdom)
- Paella (Spain)
- Pilafs such as spanakorizo (Greece)
- Rice croquettes including supplì and arancini
- Risotto (Italy)

== See also ==
- List of rice dishes
