= Galho =

Naga dish made with mixed vegetables

- Alternative names: Zawo
- Place of origin: India
- Region or state: Nagaland
- Associated cuisine: Naga cuisine
- Created by: Angami Nagas & Chakhesang Nagas
- Serving temperature: Hot
- Main ingredients: Rice, Chinese Knotweed, Pork or Beef, Various vegetables

Galho, also known as Zawo, is a popular Naga food made from a mixture of rice, vegetables and various meats. It is typical served in a simple form with its core ingredients though various additions can be made as per preference.

== General recipes ==
Galho uses different kinds of ingredients such as rice, Chinese knotweed, pork or beef, various vegetables and so on.

== See also ==
- Naga cuisine
- List of rice dishes
- Mixed rice dish
