= Natto =

Japanese fermented soybeans

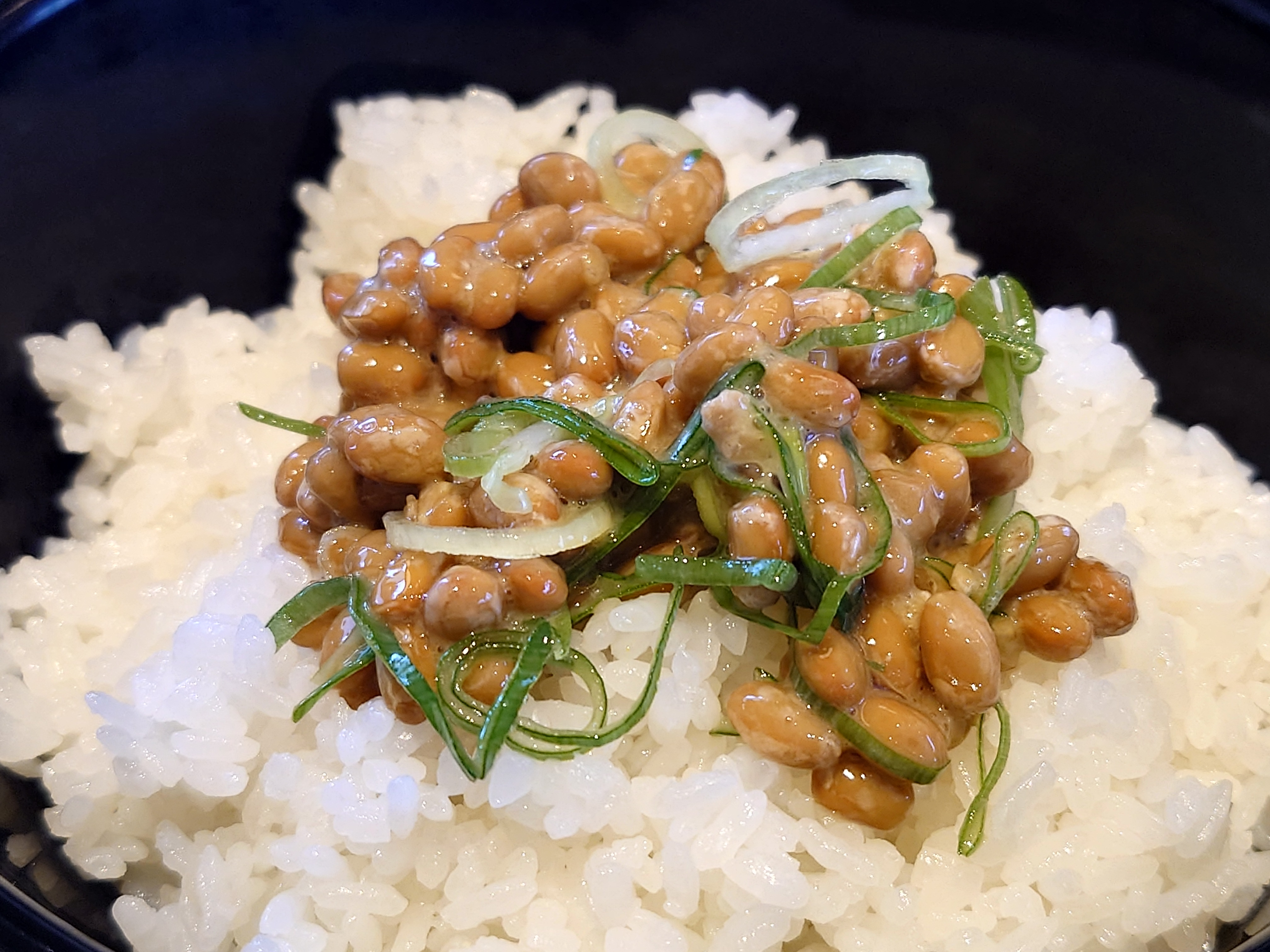
- Natto on rice
- Course: Breakfast, side dish
- Place of origin: Japan
- Region or state: East Asia
- Main ingredients: Fermented soybeans

Natto (Japanese: 納豆, Hepburn: nattō) is a traditional Japanese food made from whole soybeans that have been fermented with Bacillus subtilis var. natto. It is often served as a breakfast food with rice. It is served with karashi mustard, soy or tare sauce, and sometimes spring onion. Within Japan, natto is most popular in the eastern regions, including Kantō, Tōhoku, and Hokkaido.

Natto is often considered an acquired taste because of its powerful smell, strong flavor, and sticky, slimy texture. A 2009 survey revealed that 70% of the 3,827 respondents found the taste pleasant, and others who may not find the taste pleasant still eat the food out of habit.

== History ==
The kinema–nattō–thua nao (KNT) triangle connects Bacillus-fermented soybean foods across Asia.

Sources differ about the earliest origin of natto. One theory is that natto was codeveloped in multiple locations in the distant past, since it is simple to make with ingredients and tools commonly available in Japan since ancient times.

=== Legendary origins ===
Opening and stirring a container of natto

One story about the origin of natto attributes it to the samurai Minamoto no Yoshiie (1039–1106), who was on a campaign in northeastern Japan between 1086 and 1088 AD. One day, his troops were attacked while boiling soybeans for their horses. They hurriedly packed up the beans, and did not open the straw bags until a few days later, by which time the beans had fermented. The soldiers ate it anyway, and liked the taste, so they offered some to Yoshiie, who also liked the taste.

Another story involves Prince Shotoku (574–622), who is said to have wrapped the leftovers of boiled soybeans in straw bags for his horse. As people happened to eat these fermented beans and found them delicious, this type of fermented stringy beans soon gained popularity in Japan because of its unique taste and strong flavor.

=== Chinese douchi ===
Before natto, there was a similar dish of fermented black soybeans food in China called shì, chǐ (Chinese: 豉), or douchi (Chinese: 豆豉; pinyin: dòuchǐ). These are salted, fermented and aged whole soybean seasonings or condiments invented in China and spread throughout East Asia. They are usually made from fermented soybeans and with an ample amount of salt; however, the ingredients and production methods differ in Japan. Chinese use both black and yellow soybeans to produce douchi. The amount of salt used also differentiates douchi and natto in taste and appearance.

The cultivation methods of soybeans and rice were imported from China to Japan during the Yayoi period, and later on, the circulation of salt began to flourish in Japan. This provided an opportunity for the production of douchi to become popular in Japan. Because salt was expensive at the time, it has been suggested that natto was invented by accident during the production of douchi.

A wooden slip was excavated in Heijō-kyō, which had the Chinese character 豉 (chǐ; soybean) written on it. The excavation of the slip is considered an evidence to support the hypothesis that the invention of natto was based on the Chinese douchi imported to Japan.

The Chinese character 豉 entered Japan in the 8th century. It was pronounced "kuki" until the 11th century, when natto became a new name for fermented soybeans.

=== Commercialization in the Taisho period ===
A change in the production of natto occurred in the Taishō period (1912–1926), when researchers discovered a way to produce a natto starter culture containing Bacillus subtilis without the need for straw, thereby simplifying the commercial production of natto and enabling more consistent results.

== Nutrition ==
Nattō
Nutritional value per 100 g
- Energy: 211 kcal (880 kJ)
- Carbohydrates: 12.7 g
- Sugars: 4.9 g
- Dietary fiber: 5.4 g
- Fat: 11 g
- Protein: 19.4 g
Vitamins and minerals
Vitamins	Quantity %DV^{†}
Thiamine (B1)	13% 0.16 mg
Riboflavin (B2)	15% 0.19 mg
Niacin (B3)	0% 0 mg
Vitamin B6	8% 0.13 mg
Folate (B9)	2% 8 μg
Vitamin C	14% 13 mg
Vitamin K	19% 23 μg
Minerals	Quantity %DV^{†}
Calcium	17% 217 mg
Copper	74% 0.667 mg
Iron	48% 8.6 mg
Magnesium	27% 115 mg
Phosphorus	14% 174 mg
Potassium	24% 729 mg
Selenium	16% 8.8 μg
Sodium	0% 7 mg
Zinc	27% 3 mg
- Other constituents: Quantity
- Water: 55 g
- Link to USDA Database Entry
- ^{†}Percentages estimated using US recommendations for adults, except for potassium, which is estimated based on expert recommendation from the National Academies.

Natto is 55% water, 13% carbohydrates, 19% protein, and 11% fat (table). In a reference amount of 100 grams (3.5 ounces), natto supplies 211 calories, and is a rich source (20% or more of the Daily Value, DV) of several dietary minerals, including copper, iron, and magnesium. Natto contains vitamin C, vitamin K1, and two B vitamins in moderate amounts (table).

Natto is a rich dietary source of menaquinones (vitamin K2), including menaquinone-7 (MK-7) and menaquinone-8 (MK-8). The US National Institutes of Health lists 850 micrograms of MK-7 per 3-ounce (approximately 85 g) serving. Reported MK-7 concentrations differ substantially between analyses.

Vitamin K can interfere with the anticoagulant effect of warfarin; changes in dietary vitamin K intake can alter its effects.

== Appearance and consumption ==
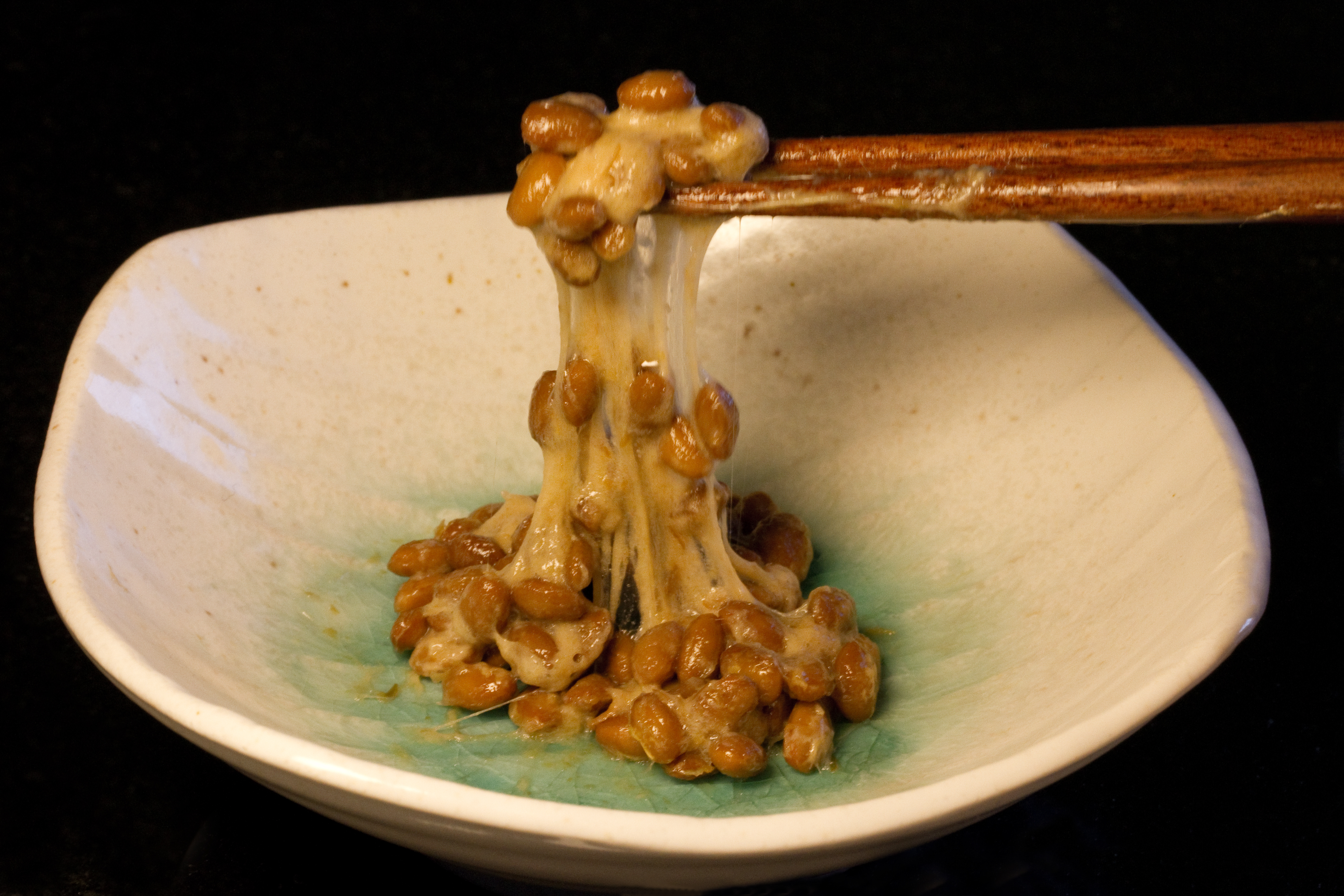
Natto with sticky, slimy strands caused by fermentation with bacteria

Natto has a distinctive odor, somewhat akin to a pungent aged cheese. Stirring natto produces many sticky strings. The dish is eaten cold with rice, mixed with the included soy sauce or karashi mustard if eaten from a commercially packaged natto. Other ingredients such as long onion or kimchi are often added.

Natto is frequently eaten as nattō gohan (natto on rice). Natto is occasionally used in other foods, such as natto sushi (nattōmaki), natto toast, in miso soup, tamagoyaki, salad, as an ingredient in okonomiyaki, chahan, or even with spaghetti. Sometimes soybeans are crushed before fermenting.

Many find the taste unpleasant and smelly while others relish it as a delicacy. Natto is more popular in some areas of Japan than in others. Natto is known to be popular in the eastern Kantō region, but less popular in Kansai.

For those who dislike the smell and texture of natto, "dried natto" and "fried natto" were developed around 1990. The smell and stickiness are reduced, making it easier to eat for those who do not like conventional natto. Another type of fermented soybeans called mamenoka (Japanese: 豆乃香) has also been developed by developing versions of natto bacillus varieties that result in less sticky natto.

== Production ==
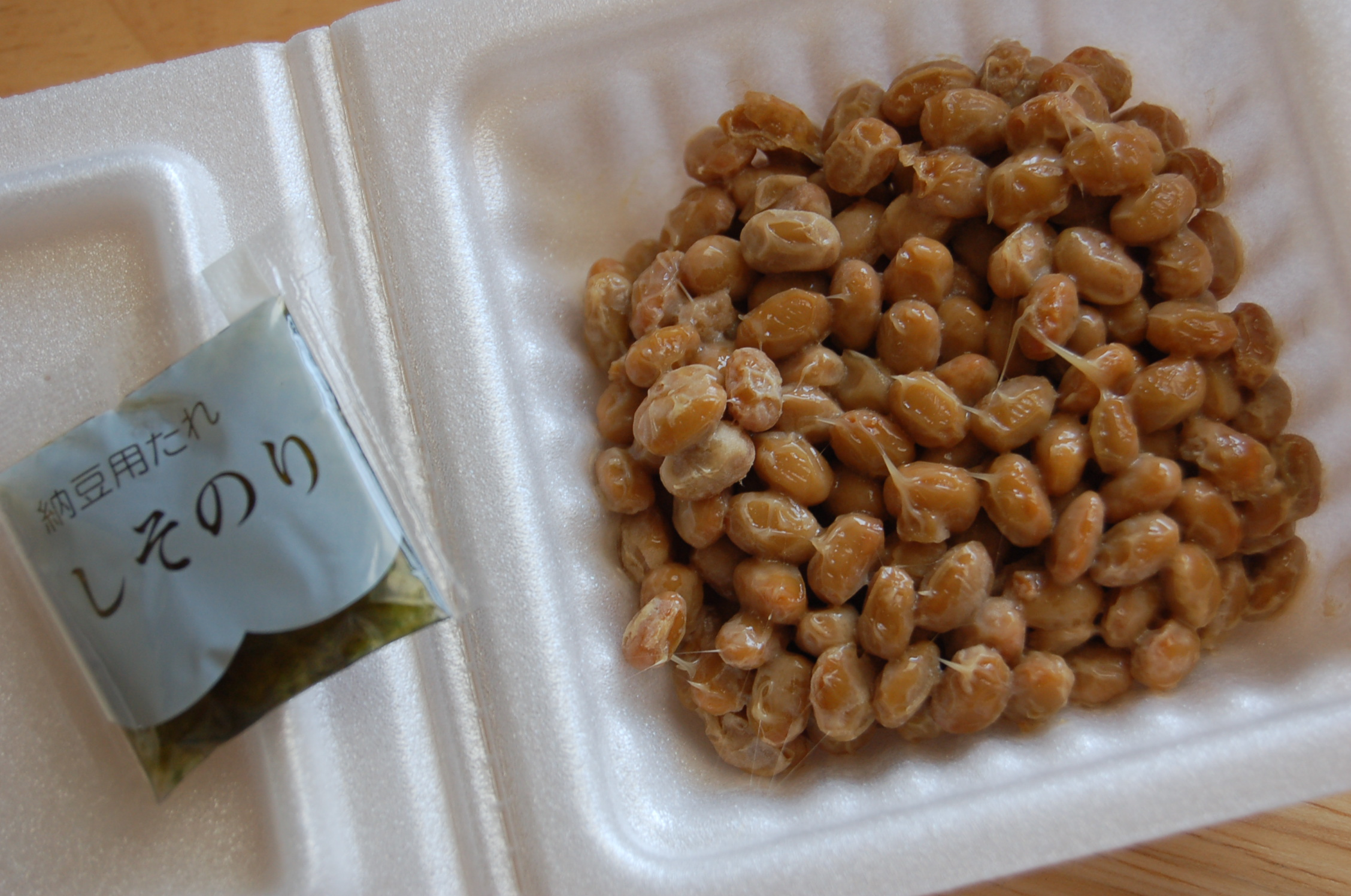
Natto in a container

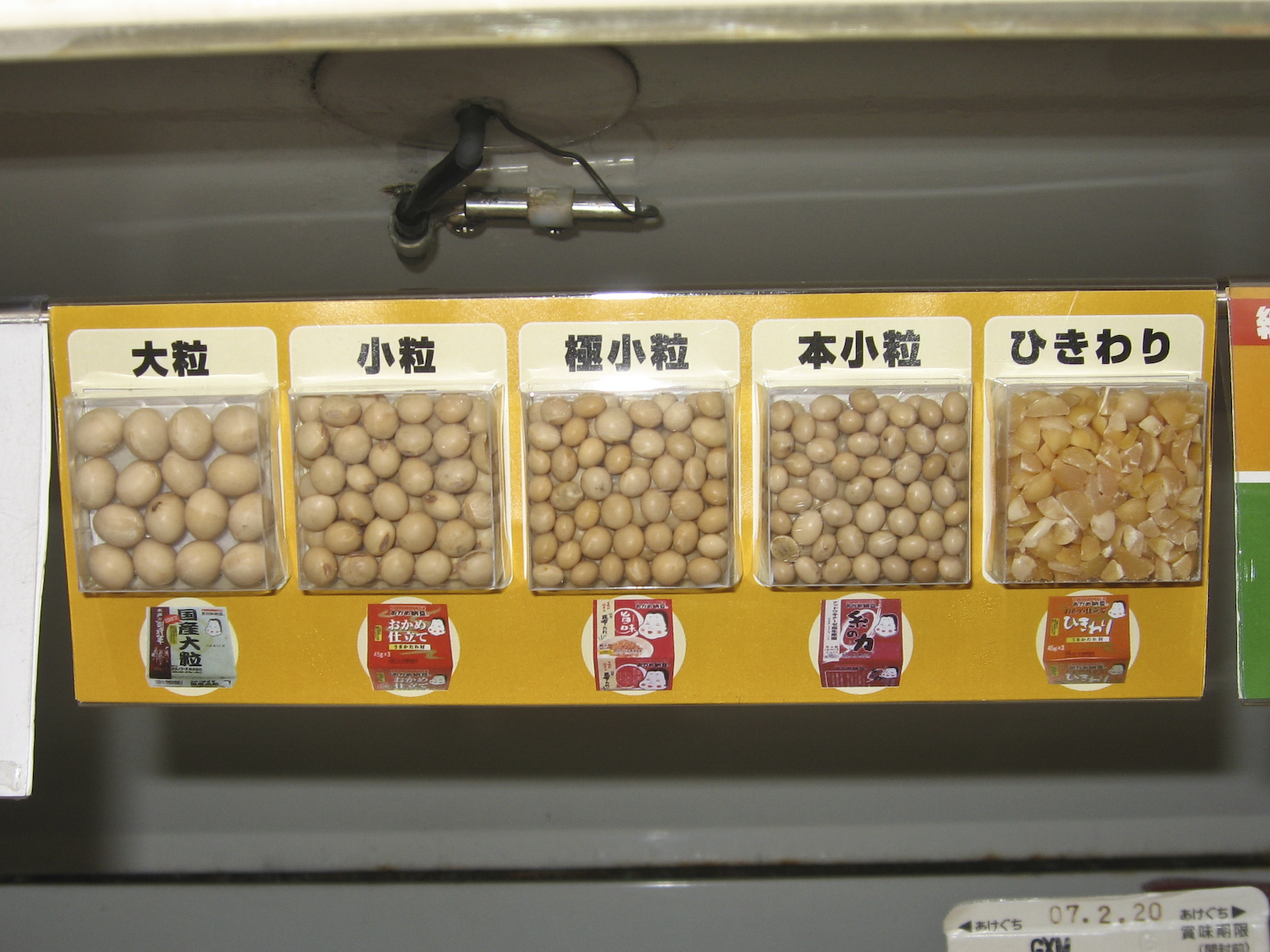
Natto beans of different sizes

Natto is made from soybeans, typically natto soybeans. Smaller beans are preferred, as the fermentation process will be able to reach the center of the bean more easily. The beans are washed and soaked in water for 12 to 20 hours to hydrate them, and increase their size. Next, the soybeans are steamed for six hours, although a pressure cooker may be used to reduce the time. The cooked beans are mixed with the bacterium Bacillus subtilis, known as nattō-kin in Japanese. From this point on, care must be taken to keep the ingredients away from impurities and other bacteria. The mixture is fermented at 40 °C (104 °F) for up to 24 hours. Afterward, the natto is cooled, then aged in a refrigerator for up to one week to allow the development of stringiness.

In natto-making facilities, these processing steps have to be done while avoiding incidents in which soybeans are touched by workers. Even though workers use B. subtilis natto as the starting culture, which can suppress some undesired bacterial growth, workers pay extra-close attention not to introduce skin flora onto soybeans.

Mass-produced natto is sold in small polystyrene containers. A typical package contains two, three, or occasionally four containers, each 40 to 50 g (1.4 to 1.8 oz). One container typically complements a small bowl of rice.

Natto odor comes from diacetyl and pyrazines, but if it is allowed to ferment too long, then ammonia is released. The fermenting of natto develops glutamic acid, which is why it has an umami flavour.

== Related products ==
Many countries around Asia also produce similar traditional soybean foods fermented with Bacillus bacteria, such as shuidouchi (水豆豉) of China, cheonggukjang (청국장) of Korea, thua nao (ถั่วเน่า) of Thailand, kinema of Nepal and the Himalayan regions of West Bengal and Sikkim, tungrymbai of Meghalaya, hawaijaar of Manipur, bekang um of Mizoram, akhuni of Nagaland, and piak of Arunachal Pradesh, India.

== Gallery ==
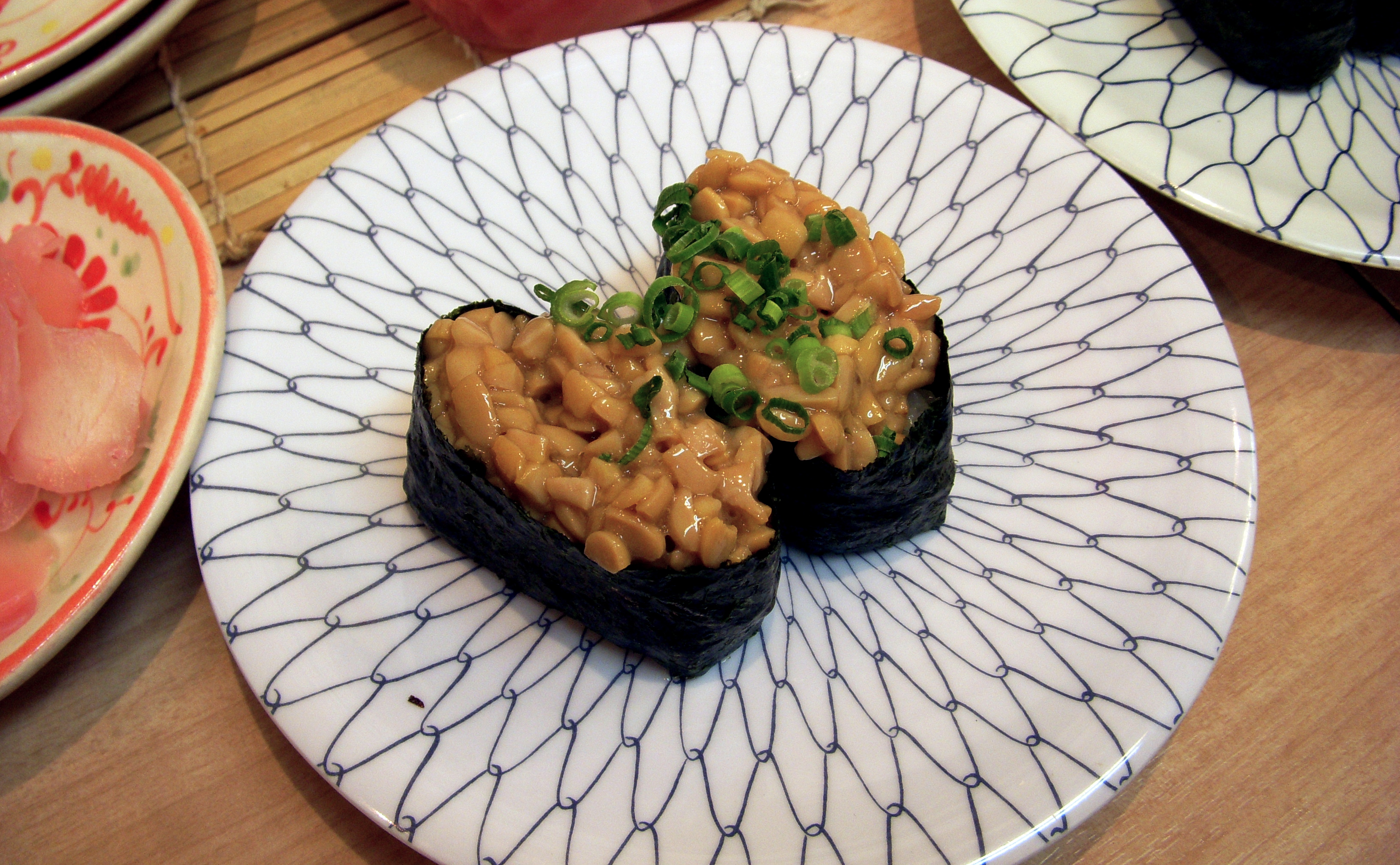
Nattō gunkan maki (natto sushi)

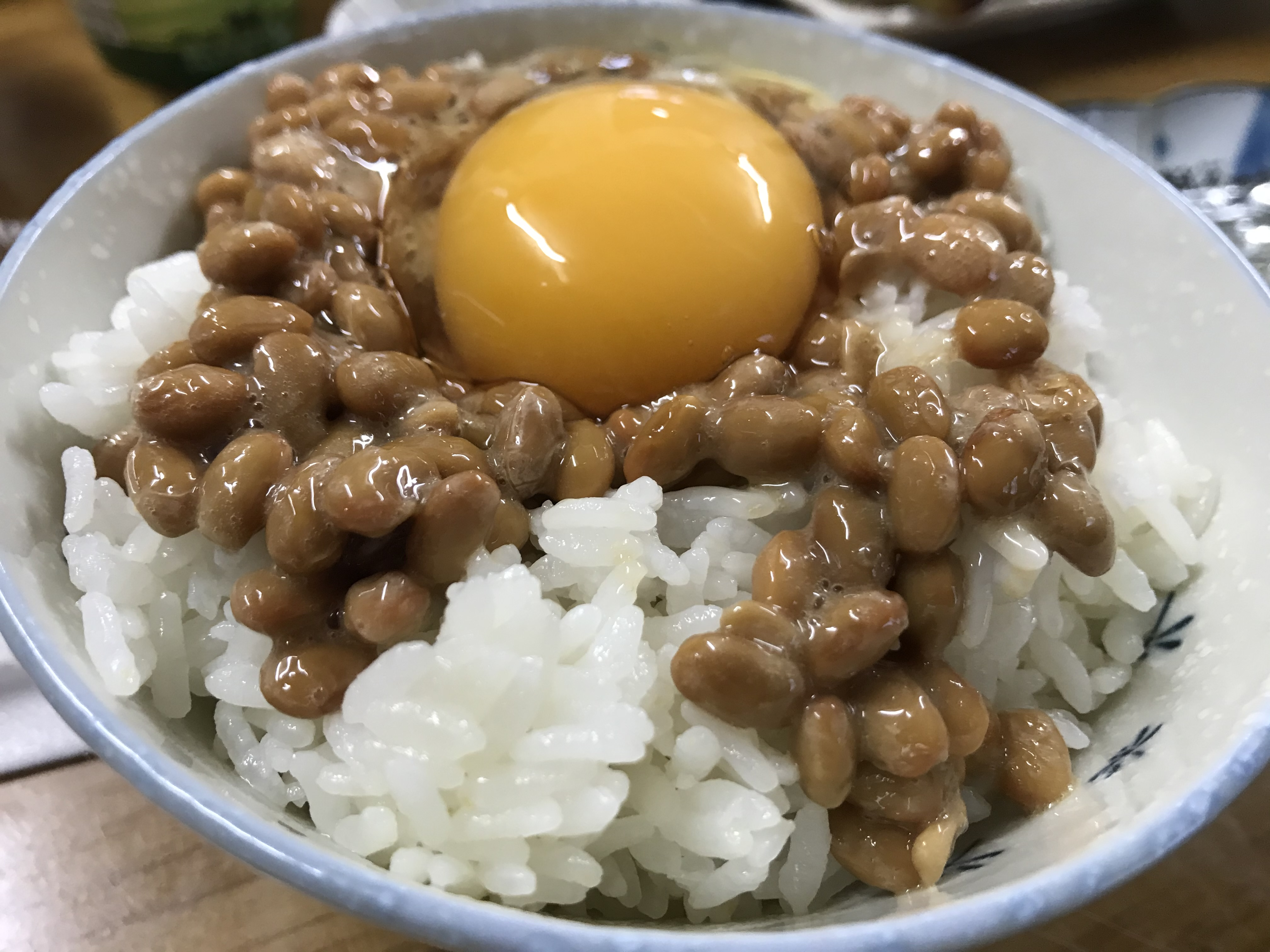
Natto served on white rice with raw egg

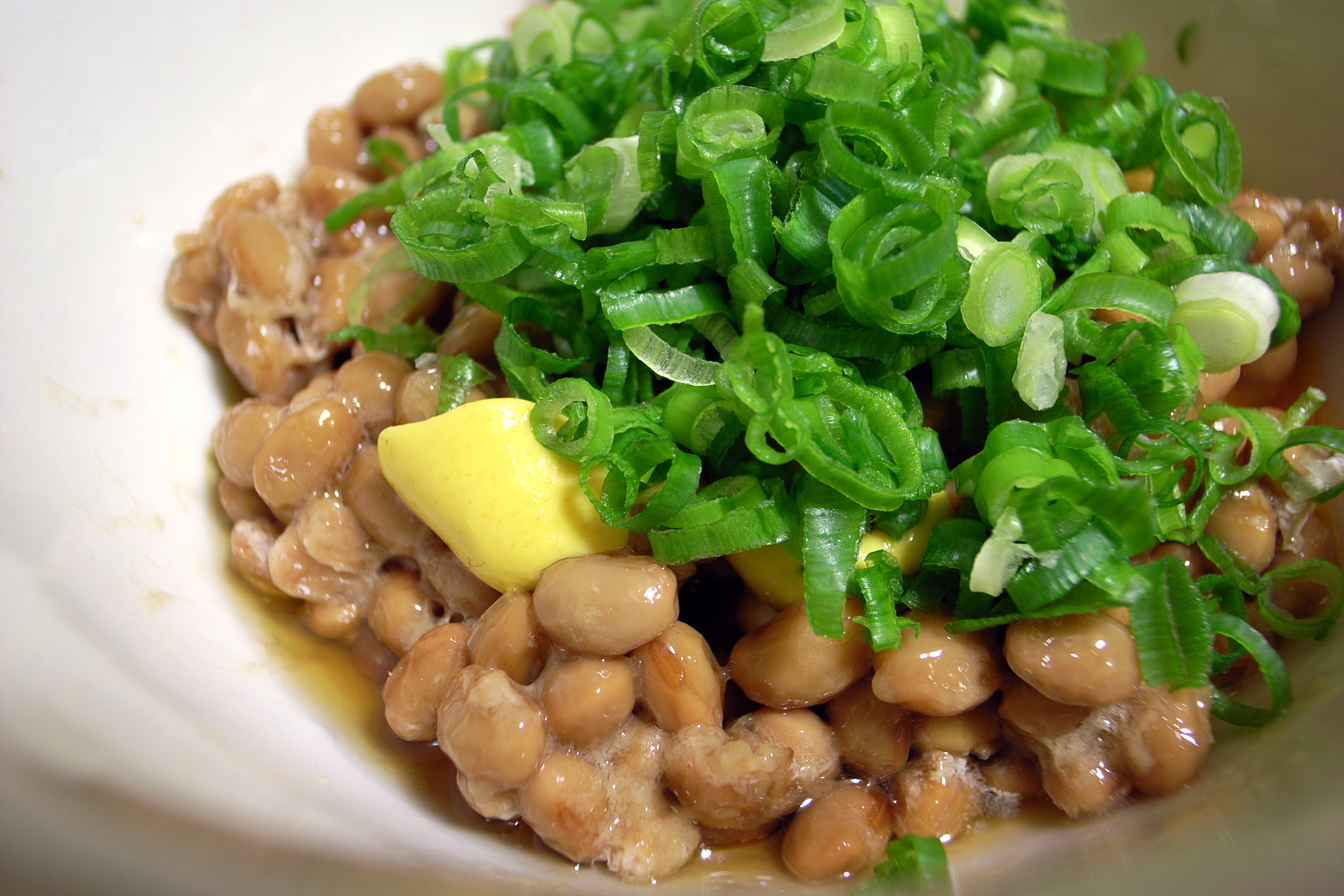
Natto topped with karashi mustard and negi onion

== See also ==
- Cheonggukjang – Traditional Korean food made by fermenting soybeans.
- Fermented bean paste – Fermented foods made from ground soybeans
- Japanese cuisine – Other fermented soy foods include soy sauce, Japanese miso and fermented tofu.
- Kinema – traditional Nepalese food made from fermented soybean
- List of ancient dishes and foods
- List of fermented soy products
- List of soy-based foods
- Nattokinase
- Oncom – Indonesian traditional fermented dish
