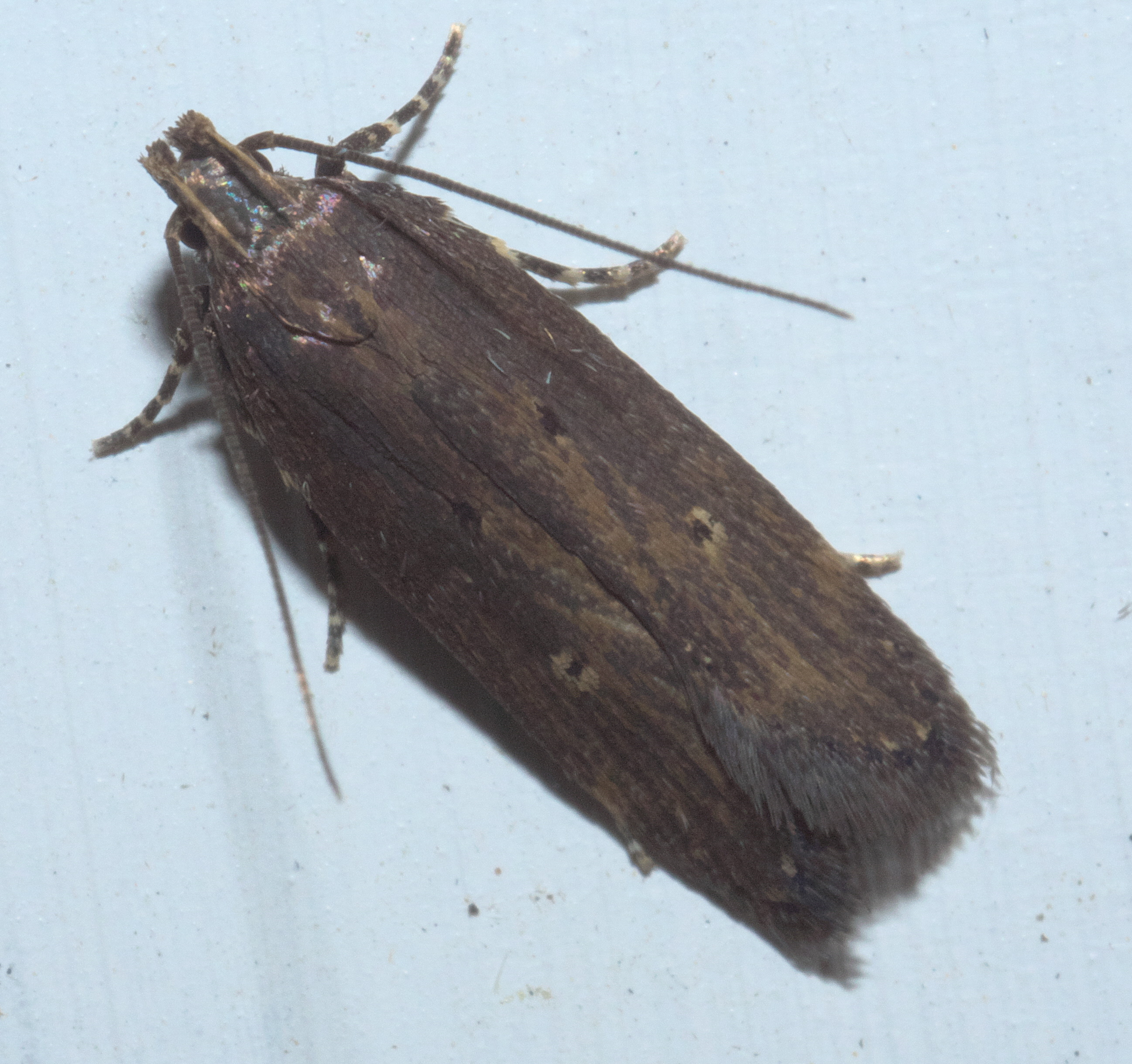

Scientific classification
- Kingdom: Animalia
- Phylum: Arthropoda
- Clade: Pancrustacea
- Class: Insecta
- Order: Lepidoptera
- Family: Gelechiidae
- Genus: Chionodes
- Species: C. discoocellella

Binomial name
- Chionodes discoocellella (Chambers, 1872)

Synonyms
- Gelechia discoocellella Chambers, 1872; Gelechia violaceofusca Zeller, 1873

= Chionodes discoocellella =

Species of moth

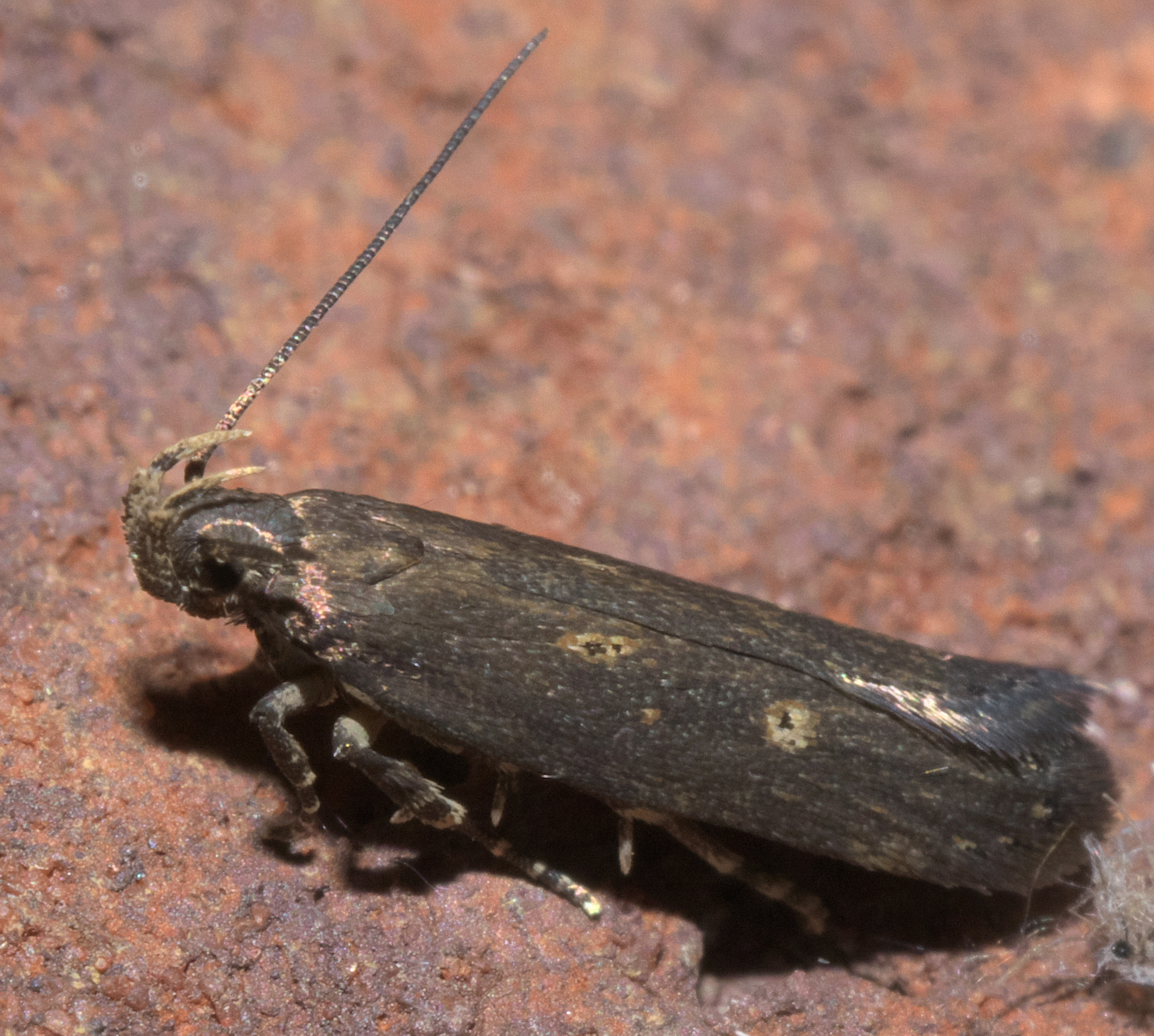
Chionodes discoocellella, eyeringed chionodes moth, Size: 7.3 mm

Chionodes discoocellella, the eyeringed chionodes moth, is a moth in the family Gelechiidae. It is found in the United States, where it has been recorded from Maine to South Dakota, Florida, Texas and Colorado.

The forewings are brown, tinged with roseate or purple, and faintly streaked with ocherous within the inner margin, and with a yellowish-white spot containing a black central dot at the end of the disc, a small black spot on the fold, and one about the middle of the wing, and with a few ocherous-yellow small spots around the apex between the nervules.

The larvae feed on Fallopia convolvulus, Persicaria chinensis, Persicaria pensylvanica, Persicaria punctata and Rumex crispus.
