= Akhuni =

Indian fermented soybeans

Axone
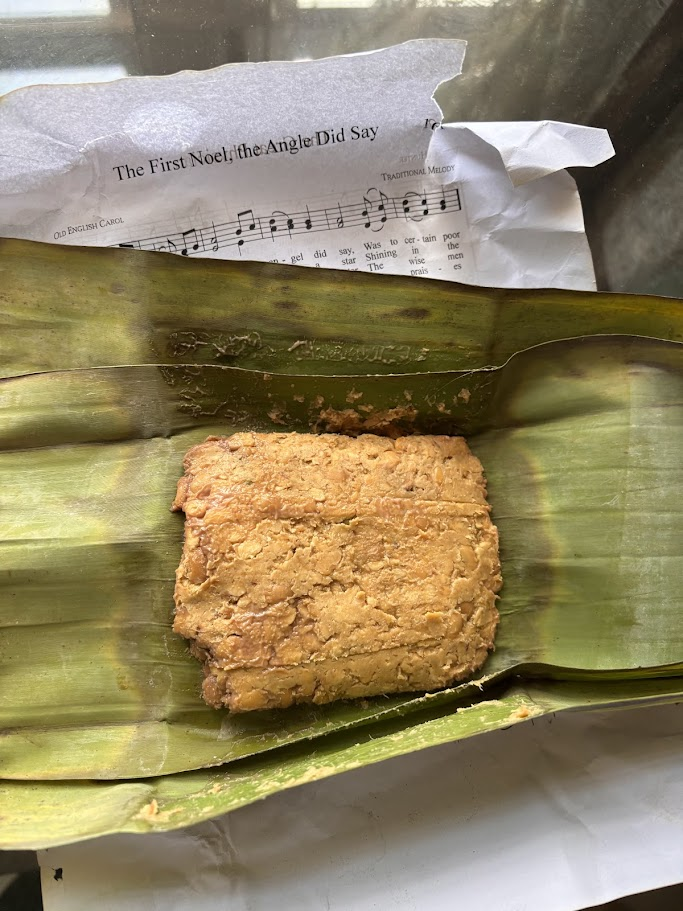
- Type: Fermented soybeans
- Place of origin: India; Myanmar
- Region or state: Nagaland; Kachin state Sagaing Region
- Associated cuisine: Naga cuisine, Kachin cuisine, Thai cuisine
- Created by: Naga people
- Main ingredients: Soybean
- Similar dishes: Thua nao, kinema, tungrymbai, other soy fermented products

Axone is a fermented soybean product commonly used in Naga cuisine of India and Myanmar.

== Etymology ==
The word Axone is from the Naga Sümi language, and is a combination of two words. Axo means "aroma" or "smell" and ne or nhe (similar word "tho") means "deep" or "strong". So it can be literally translated as "deep smell" or "strong smell".

== Consumption ==
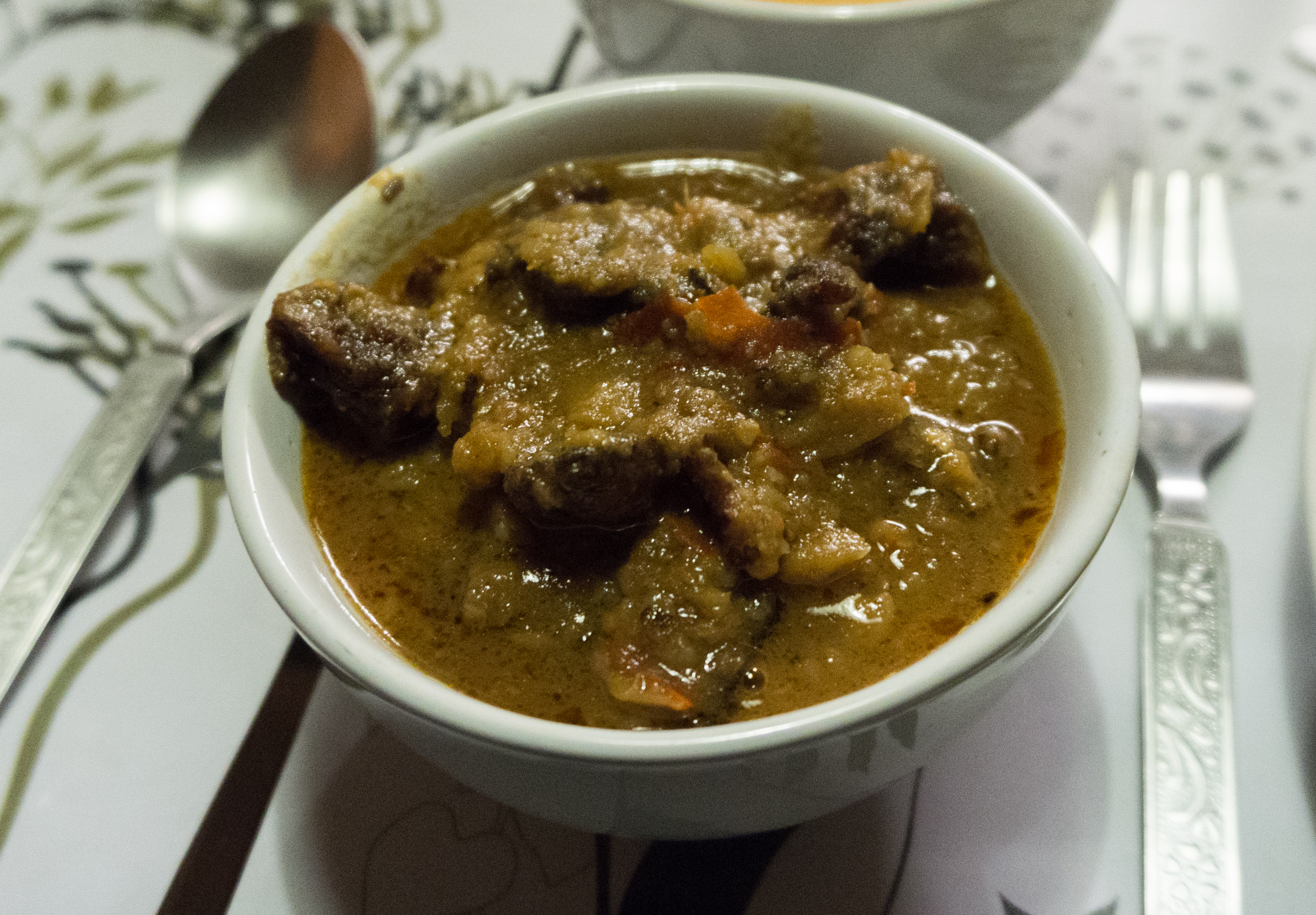
Naga smoked pork with akhuni

It is prepared year-round from soybeans by people of all tribes, but most notably the Sümi Nagas of Nagaland. Soybeans grow at an altitude of 1,500 m and in rainy conditions, making them well suited for the Naga hills. They are also a protein-rich legume in an otherwise traditionally protein-sparse diet.

Axone is prepared by rinsing picked soybeans in fresh water, and then boiling them until they are soft, but still whole. The excess water is drained and the soybeans are placed into a pot or degchi and left either out in the sun or next to the fire to let them ferment. This takes three to four days to ferment in summer and around one week in winter.

As with the majority of fermented products in Nagaland, it is considered to be ready when it "smells right". The soybeans are then placed in a wooden pestle and mashed with a mortar. They are not mashed completely but instead crushed comparably to garlic. A handful is then scooped up and placed in the center of a banana leaf, its edges closed to make a parcel. The package is sold or stored next to the fire and can be used immediately or kept for some weeks, darkening in color each day.

Axone fermentation results in proteolysis giving it a distinctive umami taste. Axone is then used in a wide variety of dishes. Two examples are fire-smoked pork and axone and nula (snails with axone).

== In popular culture ==
A 2019 Indian Hindi/English film titled Axone, directed by Nicholas Kharkongor, deals with a day in the lives of a group of friends getting ready for a wedding and cooking axone in a Delhi neighborhood which does not allow them to cook axone because of its strong smell.

== Similar dishes ==
Piak of Arunachal Pradesh, Nepali kinema, tungrymbai of Meghalaya, hawaijaar of Manipur and bekang um of Mizoram.
