= Kinema =

Nepali fermented soybean

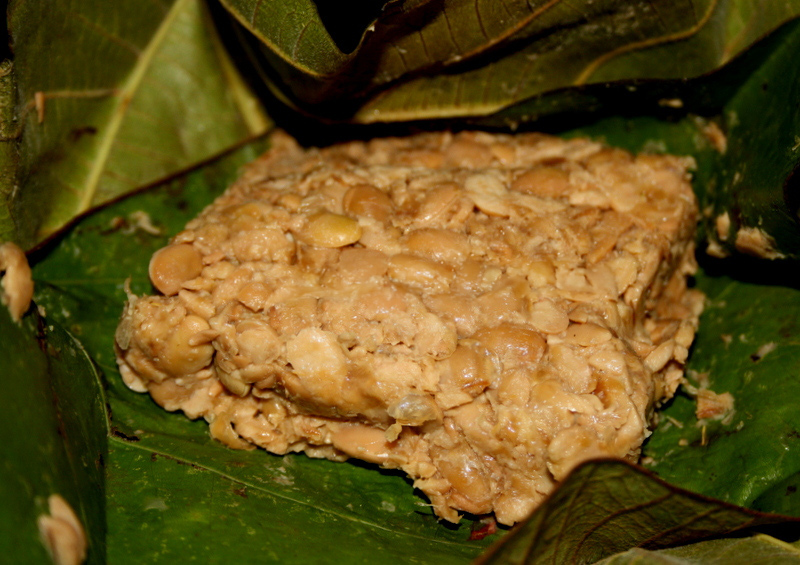
- Kinema on a traditional leaf wrapping
- Alternative names: Kinama, kinemba, chembihik, hokuma, goyang, ghogima
- Type: Fermented food
- Place of origin: Limbuwan ( ᤕᤠᤀᤷᤓᤢᤅ ᤗᤠᤈᤣ ) present-day Eastern Nepal
- Region or state: Nepal; India (Sikkim, Darjeeling, Kalimpong); Bhutan
- Main ingredients: Soybean fermented by Bacillus subtilis
- Variations: Soup, achar
- Similar dishes: Other fermented products

Kinema (Nepali: किनेमा; Limbu: ᤁᤡᤏᤠᤶᤒᤠ, Kinaamba), also known as hongema and hokima, is a traditional food of the Limbu people now also prepared by the Kirat people of the Eastern Himalayas region: Eastern Nepal, and Darjeeling, Kalimpong and Sikkim regions of India. Kinema is made from soybeans that are fermented.

== History ==
The word kinema is believed to be derived from the Limbu language kinama, where ki means fermented and nama means to smell. It is a traditional food of the Limbu people.

According to microbiologist Jyoti Prakash Tamang, kinema is estimated to have originated around 600 BC to 100 AD during Kirat dynasty rule, introduced by Limbu people.

== Production ==
The first step of kinema production is soaking soybeans overnight. The soaked beans are boiled until soft (2–3 hours). Water is drained off and beans are lightly cracked with a mortar. 1% of firewood ash is added and mixed thoroughly. The grits are put in a bamboo bucket lined with local fern (Glaphyropteridopsis erubescens). The bucket is then covered with a jute bag and left to ferment naturally at ambient temperatures for 1–3 days.

No bacterial culture is intentionally added to kinema. The successful fermentation relies on natural bacteria, mainly Bacillus subtilis.

== Consumption ==
The slimy, odorous product of fermentation is traditionally prepared into a soup that is consumed with rice, but can also be turned into a savoury dip or a pungent side dish to be consumed along with rice or bread. Kinema is traditionally prepared at home, but now it is sold in local markets and even retailed online as a dried product.

== Nutritional value ==
Kinema
Nutritional value per 100 g (3.5 oz)
- Energy: 2,000 kJ (480 kcal)
- Carbohydrates: 28g
- Fat: 17g
- Protein: 48g
- ^{†}Percentages estimated using US recommendations for adults.

Kinema is considered a healthy food because fermentation breaks down complex proteins into easily digestible amino acids. The product is alkaline with pH of 7.89, unlike soybean, which has a pH of 6.75. It has 62% moisture content. 48 g of protein, 28 g of carbohydrate, 17 g of fat and 7 g of ash is found in every 100 g of dry kinema. The energy value of kinema is 2 MJ per 100 grams. Free fatty acidity in kinema is found to be about 33 times higher than raw soybeans.

== Similar foods ==
The KNT triangle

Many other Asian countries have Bacillus-fermented soyabean dishes, such as shuidouchi of China, cheonggukjang of Korea, natto of Japan, thua nao of Thailand, tungrymbai of Meghalaya, hawaijaar of Manipur, bekangum of Mizoram, akhuni of Nagaland, and piak of Arunachal Pradesh, India.

Kinema forms one of the vertices of the "natto triangle" proposed by the Japanese ethnobiologist Sasuke Nakao. Nakao hypothesized Yunnan region of China to be the origin place of the fermented soybean technique, as the center of the triangle falls in that region. Jyoti Prakash Tamang proposed an extended kinema–nattō–thua nao (KNT) triangle, connecting the fermented soybeans across Asia. Tamang also showed evidence that all fermented soybean styles in India derive from kinema.

== See also ==
- Gundruk
- Sinki
- Masaura
