= Lin Laishram =

Indian model

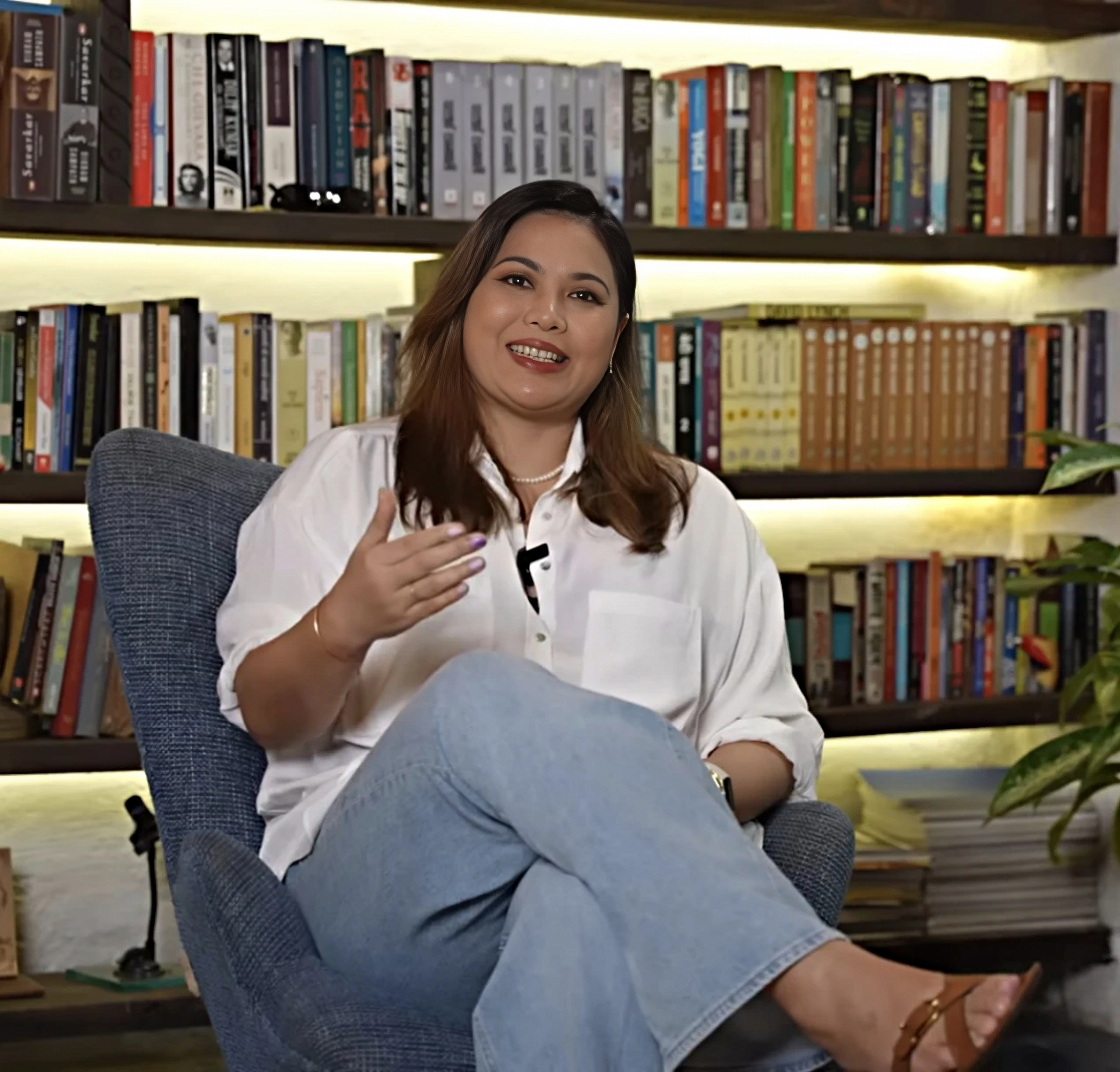
- Lin Laishram in 2025
- Born: Linthoingambi Laishram; 19 December 1985 (age 40); Imphal, Manipur, India
- Occupations: Model; Actor
- Years active: 2007–present
- Spouse: Randeep Hooda (m. 2023)

Linthoingambi "Lin" Laishram is an Indian model, actress and businesswoman. She is founder and managing director of Shamoo Sana, an Eco friendly jewellery brand. Laishram made a cameo appearance in the 2007 Hindi-language film Om Shanti Om.

== Career ==
Lin Laishram first appeared as an extra in Om Shanti Om. She was the brand ambassador of New York-based jewellery brand, Ozoru Jewelry. She represented her state in Miss North East and was the first runner up in 2008 held in Shillong. She went on to participate in the reality TV show Kingfisher Calendar Girl where she won many hearts with her charm. She is also the first Manipuri model who went on national television wearing a swimsuit, which led to many controversies in her hometown.

Laishram lived in New York, where she was a print and Fashion model and worked with many renowned photographers, make-up artists and stylists.

She studied at Stella Adler Studio of Acting while she was modelling in New York city. She headed back to Bombay and spent 3 years doing theatre with Motley by Naseeruddin Shah, Pravah theatre Lab by Neeraj Kabi, and Rangbaaz. She went on to perform in Bombay's famous theatres like Prithvi Theatre, NCPA and travelled with the productions.

She played the character of Bembem in the 2014 National award-winning movie Mary Kom alongside Priyanka Chopra and directed by Omung Kumar. She acted in a short film directed by Kenny Basumatary as well as in the Indie film Umrika directed by Prashant Nair playing a Nepali girl opposite Prateik Babbar. Lin played the character Mema in the period romantic drama Rangoon directed by Vishal Bhardwaj starring Kangana Shahid Kapoor and Saif Ali Khan.

Laishram is trained archer from Tata Archery academy in Jamshedpur, and was a Junior National Champion in 1998 Nationals held in Chandigarh.

She started her jewellery line called Shamooo Sana in March 2017.

== Personal life ==
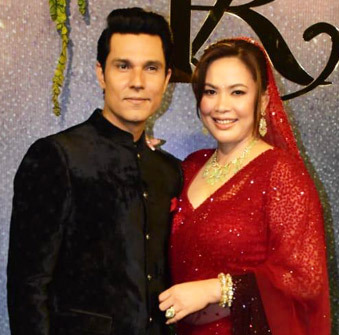
Laishram with husband Randeep Hooda in 2023.

She was born on 19 December, 1985. She and actor Randeep Hooda made their relationship official via Instagram in 2022. They got married on 29 November, 2023 in traditional Meitei ceremony in Imphal, Manipur. On 10 March, 2026 they welcomed their daughter, Nyomica.

== Filmography ==
- Om Shanti Om (2007) as Om Kapoor's Friend
- Mary Kom (2014) as Bem-Bem
- Umrika (2015) as Udai's Wife
- Rangoon (2017) as Mema
- Axone (2019) as Chanbi
- Ave Maria (2020) as Susan (short film)
- Jaane Jaan (2023) as Prema

Laishram has also appeared as an extra in Hattrick and Matru Ki Bijlee Ka Mandola.
