= Pickled mustard greens =

Popular salt-fermented dish in Hmong cuisine

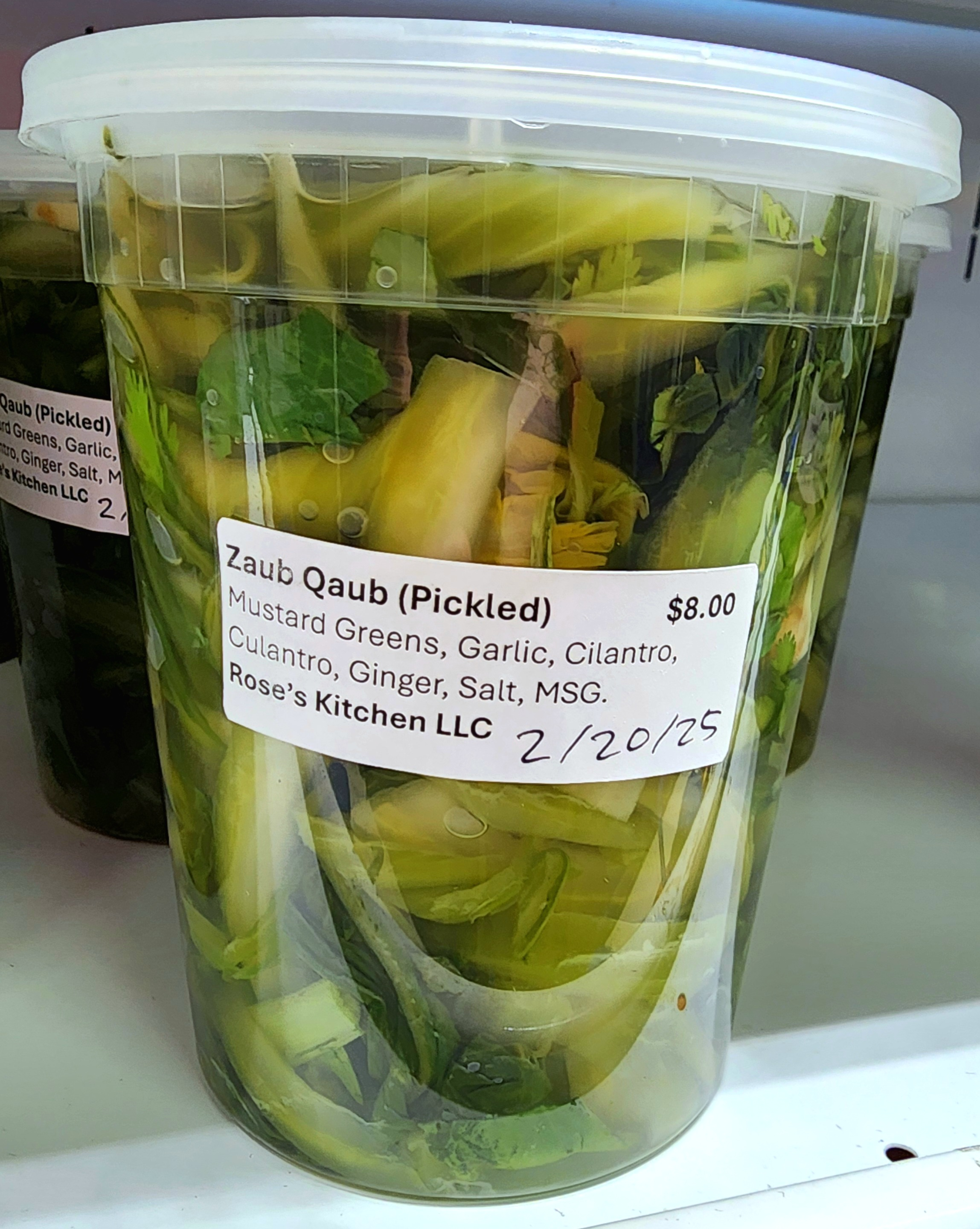
- A container of zaub quab (Hmong pickled mustard leaf) at an American supermarket
- Alternative names: Pickled mustard, zaub qaub (Hmong), som pak (Lao)
- Course: side dish
- Place of origin: Southeast Asia
- Associated cuisine: Southeast Asian cuisine
- Main ingredients: mustard greens; rice water
- Ingredients generally used: vinegar; salt

Pickled mustard greens are a popular dish in Hmong cuisine. In Laotian it’s called som pak. The dish is traditionally made by putting fresh mustard greens into a container, typically a large pot, along with rice water, chillies, salt, and other spices if desired. The pot is then left usually at room temperature or in a sunny spot to ferment. After a few days, the pickled mustard is ready to eat. In modern practice, vinegar is sometimes added to the mixture to speed up the preparation of the dish.

"Pickled mustard greens" is a common dish across East and Southeast Asia, although the English phrase is non-specific. In China there is xuě cài (雪菜), made with a leafy mustard variety called xuě lǐ hóng (雪里蕻), and in Southern China haam choy, made with gai choy mustard leaf. Japanese pickled mustard greens are called takanazuke (高菜漬け), which is marinated in vinegar, sugar, salt, and an umami soy-based sauce.

== See also ==
- Zha cai – pickled mustard stem
- Gundruk – Nepali fermented vegetable dish
- List of pickled foods
