= Axone (film) =

- Film poster
- Directed by: Nicholas Kharkongor
- Produced by: Siddharth Anand Kumar; Vikram Mehra
- Starring: Sayani Gupta; Vinay Pathak; Dolly Ahluwalia; Lin Laishram; Adil Hussain
- Cinematography: Parasher Baruah
- Edited by: Suresh Pai
- Music by: Papon; M. Mangangsana; Mangka Mayanglambam; Tajdar Junaid
- Production companies: Saregama India; Yoodlee films
- Distributed by: Netflix
- Release dates: 2 October 2019 (London); 19 October 2019 (Mumbai); 12 June 2020 (India)
- Running time: 96 minutes
- Country: India
- Languages: Hindi; English

Axone is a 2019 Indian comedy-drama film directed by Nicholas Kharkongor and produced by Yoodlee Films, Saregama India's film division. The film stars Sayani Gupta, Vinay Pathak, Lin Laishram, Dolly Ahluwalia, Adil Hussain, Lanuakum Ao, Tenzin Dalha, and Rohan Joshi. The film follows Northeast Indian migrants in New Delhi, in their attempt to organize a wedding party. The film premiered at the London Film Festival on 2 October 2019.

== Plot ==
The story tells of a group of migrants from Northeast India to Delhi, Upasana, Chanbi, and Zorem, who are trying to help their friend Minam with her wedding preparations. Minam, who shares a flat with Upasana, Chanbi, and others from their region, is called away suddenly for an interview. Meanwhile, her friends try to find an ingredient to make 'Axone,' a special dish that they want for the wedding. The friends face various difficulties as they attempt to plan the wedding and prepare Axone. The other tenants object and the landlord's mother-in-law enforces her rule against parties or spicy cooking in the flat. They decide to hold the wedding at Chanbi's boyfriend Bendang's flat, but finding a way to cook Axone without drawing the attention of locals brings comical problems.

Shiv, the landlord's son, and a friend of Zorem, lends his hand. His girlfriend breaks up with him when she sees him with Upasana, and later with Chanbi. As the wedding hour nears, the friends are discouraged at the thought of failing Minam (who has not yet returned). Zorem finally resolves to cook Axone on Upasana's landlord's terrace, and receives the landlord's permission in spite of his mother-in-law. The friends manage to prepare the Axone just in time for the wedding.

The marriage commences with Minam initiating a video conference with her groom and family from her hometown with Minam’s sister standing in for her, which the friends had not realized. After the ceremony, Zorem proposes to Upasana, and Chanbi decides to go back to her hometown with Bendang. In the meantime, Bendang reconciles with a racist incident from his past. In the end, the friends indulge in Axone, while Shiv laments not being able to find any mainland Indian cuisine.

== Cast ==
- Sayani Gupta as Upasana
- Lin Laishram as Chanbi
- Lanuakum Ao as Bendang
- Rohan Joshi as Shiv
- Merenla Imsong as Balamon
- Tenzin Dalha as Zorem
- Asenla Jamir as Minam
- Dolly Ahluwalia as Nani, Landlord mother
- Vinay Pathak as Landlord
- Samit Gambhir as Rakesh (eve teaser), Supporting/ Guest Appearance
- Eliel R Famhoite as Lalrempui
- Milo Sunka as Hayna
- Aakash Bhardwaj as Hironya
- Deepansha Dhingra as Shiv's Girlfriend
- Jimpa Bhutia as Bunty
- Pallavi Batra as Secretary's Daughter-in-Law
- Vijay Kumar Dogra as Rowdy neighbor
- Adil Hussain as the man outside Zorem shop (Special appearance).

== Production ==
The film took 25 days to shoot on locations in New Delhi.

=== Soundtrack ===
Axone

Soundtrack album by Papon, M. Mangangsana, Mangka Mayanglambam and Tajdar Junaid
- Released: 24 June 2020
- Recorded: 2018–19
- Genre: Feature film soundtrack
- Length: 26:09
- Language: Hindi Khasi Meiteilon Assamese
- Label: Saregama Music
External audio
- Official Audio Jukebox on YouTube

The multi-lingual soundtrack includes Papon, M. Mangangsana, Mangka Mayanglambam and Tajdar Junaid with lyrics written by Vaibhav Modi and Kh. Mangi Singh.

Track listing
No.	Title	Lyrics	Music	Singer(s)	Length
1.	"Dance It Out"	Vaibhav Modi	Papon	Papon	3:09
2.	"Soraren"	Kh. Mangi Singh	M. Mangangsana	Mangka Mayanglambam Pena, Mrjing M.	3:17
3.	"Nura Pakhang"	Kh. Mangi Singh	Mangka Mayanglambam	Mangka Mayanglambam Pena, Mrjing M.	2:43
4.	"Bendang's Dreamy Piano"	Tajdar Junaid	Tajdar Junaid	-	1:44
5.	"Bendang's Walking Away"	-	Tajdar Junaid	-	2:12
6.	"Cooking Up Storm"	-	Tajdar Junaid	-	1:01
7.	"Cousin Bhajan"	-	Tajdar Junaid	-	0:23
8.	"Hoi Kiw Dance Version"	-	Tajdar Junaid	-	1:41
9.	"Hoi Kiw Song"	Maxter Warjri	Tajdar Junaid	Elisheba Khongthaw, Pyndapbiangfull Wanniang, Freddy Connor Kharmutee, Gabriel G. Momin, Denzil N. Marbaniang, Phillip Carson Basaiawmoit, Rihunlang M. Basaiawmoit	1:40
10.	"Looking into Void"	-	Tajdar Junaid	-	2:00
11.	"Tokari Geet"	-	-	Umakanta Bairagi	4:31
12.	"Upasana's Theme"	-	Tajdar Junaid	-	1:48
Total length:					26:09

== Release ==
The film premiered at the London Film Festival on 2 October 2019 and made its debut in India at the Mumbai Film Festival (MAMI) on 19 October 2019. The film was released on Netflix on 12 June 2020.

On the review aggregator website Rotten Tomatoes, 100% of 5 critics' reviews are positive, with an average rating of 8/10.

== See also ==
- Akhuni
