= Mantra (2016 film) =

- first look poster
- Directed by: Nicholas Kharkongor
- Produced by: Nikhil Chaudhary
- Starring: Rajat Kapoor; Lushin Dubey; Kalki Koechlin; Shiv Panditt; Adil Hussain
- Cinematography: Harmeet Basur
- Edited by: Bhupesh 'Micky' Sharma
- Music by: Sagar Desai
- Distributed by: V One Entertainment
- Release dates: 6 December 2016 (SAIFF); 17 March 2017 (India)
- Running time: 90 minutes
- Country: India
- Languages: English; Hindi

Mantra is a 2016 Indian drama film directed by Nicholas Kharkongor. The film stars Rajat Kapoor, Kalki Koechlin, Shiv Panditt, and Lushin Dubey in pivotal roles. The film was jointly produced by Filmart Productions, North East Films, Shri Production, and Zenyth Media House. The film features dialogues in both English and Hindi.

== Plot ==
Mantra tells the story of a businessman, Kapil Kapoor, and his family. The backdrop of the film is a changing India in the first decade of the new millennium.

== Cast ==
The cast of the film is as follows:

- Rajat Kapoor as Kapil Kapoor
- Lushin Dubey as Meenakshi Kapoor
- Kalki Koechlin as Piya Kapoor
- Shiv Panditt as Viraj Kapoor
- Adil Hussain as Man from Jharkhand
- Rohan Joshi as Vir Kapoor
- Yuri Suri as Mohan Kaul
- Maya Krishna Rao as Shazia Siddiqui
- Shantanu Bhamare

== Production ==
Mantra was written and directed by Nicholas Kharkongor. The film was jointly produced by Filmart Productions, North East Films, Shri Production, Zenyth Media House and Bhavana Goparaju as an Associate Producer.

== Release ==
Mantra had its world premiere at the 2016 South Asian International Film Festival.

=== Critical reception ===
Upon release in India, the film received mixed response. Ranjibdar in his review of the film wrote, "Rajat Kapoor shows he has the able shoulders to carry us through the autumn of the patriarch, but Kharkongor’s script fails him, refusing to go into the labyrinth of inner turmoil, and trying awakening." He also wrote that the film resembles Zoya Akhtar’s Dil Dhadakne Do.
