= Maa Ka Sum =

- Promotional release poster
- Genre: Drama
- Written by: Ravinder Randhawa; Sumrit Shahi; Vinay Choudhary
- Directed by: Nicholas Kharkongor
- Starring: Mona Singh; Mihir Ahuja; Angira Dhar
- Country of origin: India
- Original language: Hindi
- No. of seasons: 1
- No. of episodes: 8

Production
- Producers: Babita Ashiwal; Adi Sharmaa
- Running time: 28–38 minutes
- Production company: Eunoia Films

Original release
- Network: Amazon Prime Video
- Release: 3 April 2026

Maa Ka Sum is a 2026 Indian Hindi-language drama television series written by Ravinder Randhawa and Sumrit Shahi, directed by Nicholas Kharkongor. Produced under Eunoia Films, the series stars Mona Singh, Mihir Ahuja and Angira Dhar.

== Cast ==
- Mona Singh as Vinita
- Mihir Ahuja as Agastya
- Angira Dhar as Ira
- Ranveer Brar as Vinta's love interest
- Javed Khan as King
- Celesti Bairagey as Annie, Agastya's ex-girlfriend
- Yuktam Khoslla as Junaid
- Hetal Gada as Manjari
- Ishank Saluja as Lakshvir

== Production ==
The series was announced on Amazon Prime Video. A special screening of the series was held at Mumbai on 4 April 2026.

== Music ==
Maa Ka Sum

Soundtrack album by Aman Pant, Nayantara Bhatkal, Aditya N.
- Released: March 31, 2026
- Genre: Soundtrack
- Length: 8:00
- Language: Hindi
- Label: Sony Music India
External audio
- Maa Ka Sum | Jukebox | Mona Singh, Mihir Ahuja | Aman Pant, Nayantara Bhatkal; Aditya N. on YouTube

Track listing
No.	Title	Lyrics	Music	Singer(s)	Length
1.	"Batiyaan"	Akhil Tiwari	Aman Pant	Suvarna Tiwari	2:40
2.	"Main Hoon Tere Liye"	Suresh Bhatia	Nayantara Bhatkal, Aditya N.	Hamsika Iyer, Nakul Chugh	2:25
3.	"Beparwah"	Swati Marwal	Nayantara Bhatkal, Aditya N.	Harjot Kaur	2:55
Total length:					8:00

== Release ==
The trailer of the series was released on 27 March 2026. The series was made available to stream on Amazon Prime Video on 3 April 2026.

== Reception ==
Sukanya Verma of Rediff rated the series two star out of five stars, writing, "Despite a promising premise, the eight-part series is overly enamoured with the protagonist's 'geekdom' and failing to deliver a believable mother-son slice-of-life story." Shubhra Gupta from The Indian Express gave the series 2 1/2 out of 5 stars. Riya Sharma of Hindustan Times awarded the series 3/5 stars.

Rahul Desai of The Hollywood Reporter India commeneted that "The numbers just don’t add up." Udita Jhunjhunwala writing for the Scroll.in observed that "Maa Ka Sum begins as a cutesy, almost saccharine dramedy before veering into darker territory touching on issues such as mental health and abandonment. These shifts feel abrupt and underdeveloped, as though the series is trying to mount seriousness on an already shaky foundation."

Kartik Bhardwaj of Cinema Express rated it 2/5 stars and said that "The Prime Video show is a mere assemblage of elements lacking the x factor". Sana Farzeen of India Today also gave 2 stars out of 5 and said that "What begins as a clever, promising concept slowly turns into an overextended equation, one that keeps working itself out without arriving at a meaningful answer. And in the process, it does something unexpected. It makes math feel exhausting all over again."
