= Naga cuisine =

Culinary traditions of the Nagas

Naga cuisine consists of foods from or commonly eaten by the Naga people in Northeast India and Kachin, Sagaing Region of Myanmar, or by the Naga diaspora. Each ethnic group of the Nagas prepares its own unique style of cuisines. It most notably features rice, meats and leaf vegetables. Meat prepared by the Nagas are often smoked, dried or fermented. While Naga cuisine is part of South Asian cuisine due to national boundaries, it is closer to Southeast Asian cuisine, especially Burmese cuisine and Northern Thailand cuisine.

== Overview ==
The various ethnic group of Nagas have their own cuisines, but often exchange recipes. The cuisines have developed as a result of long-term relationship that the communities have shared with their land and Indigenous wisdom passed through the generations. The food culture is based on agro-climatic conditions, availability of edible forest resources, customary beliefs, cultural practices and taboos, social restrictions, and socio-economic conditions.

A typical Naga meal consists of rice, a meat dish, one or two boiled vegetable dishes including the leaves, and a chutney/pickle (Tathu). Rice is the main carbohydrate source in the Naga diet and this region produces a number of prized rice varieties, but rice is also imported into the region from other states. Dried/smoked meat is an important ingredient in Naga cuisine and has practical significance for sustenance farmers/foragers and hunters. Smoked meat is often kept for an entire year to provide food security for individual families. Nagas prefer boiled edible organic leaves and wild forage which makes up a large part of the diet of many Naga regions.

Naga food tends to be hot and there are several different varieties of Chili in the Naga areas. The most notable being Naga Morich and Bhut jolokia. The ginger used in the Naga cuisine is spicy, aromatic and is different from the common ginger. Garlic and ginger leaves are also used in cooking meat dishes. Sichuan pepper is also a popular spice used by the Nagas.

== Ingredients ==
Naga ingredients are acquired in diverse ways: cultivation, forage, fermentation, and trade.

- Rice: It is the staple grain of the Nagas. Its cultivation covers 70 percent of the total cultivated area.
- Bamboo shoot: Nagas use bamboo shoot in various forms: fresh, dried, and fermented. It is considered especially important for the Lotha Naga tribe while all communities use it for everyday cooking. Most tribes also consider the Lotha community to prepare the best bamboo shoot products. The bamboo species Dendrocalamus hamiltonii grows abundantly in the Lotha area, i.e., Wokha district, and along the historical Dimapur to Kohima road.The Lothas have different varieties of fermented bamboo shoots, namely Rhuju, Rhujak, Rhujon, Rhuyen and Rhujonphen.

== Dishes ==
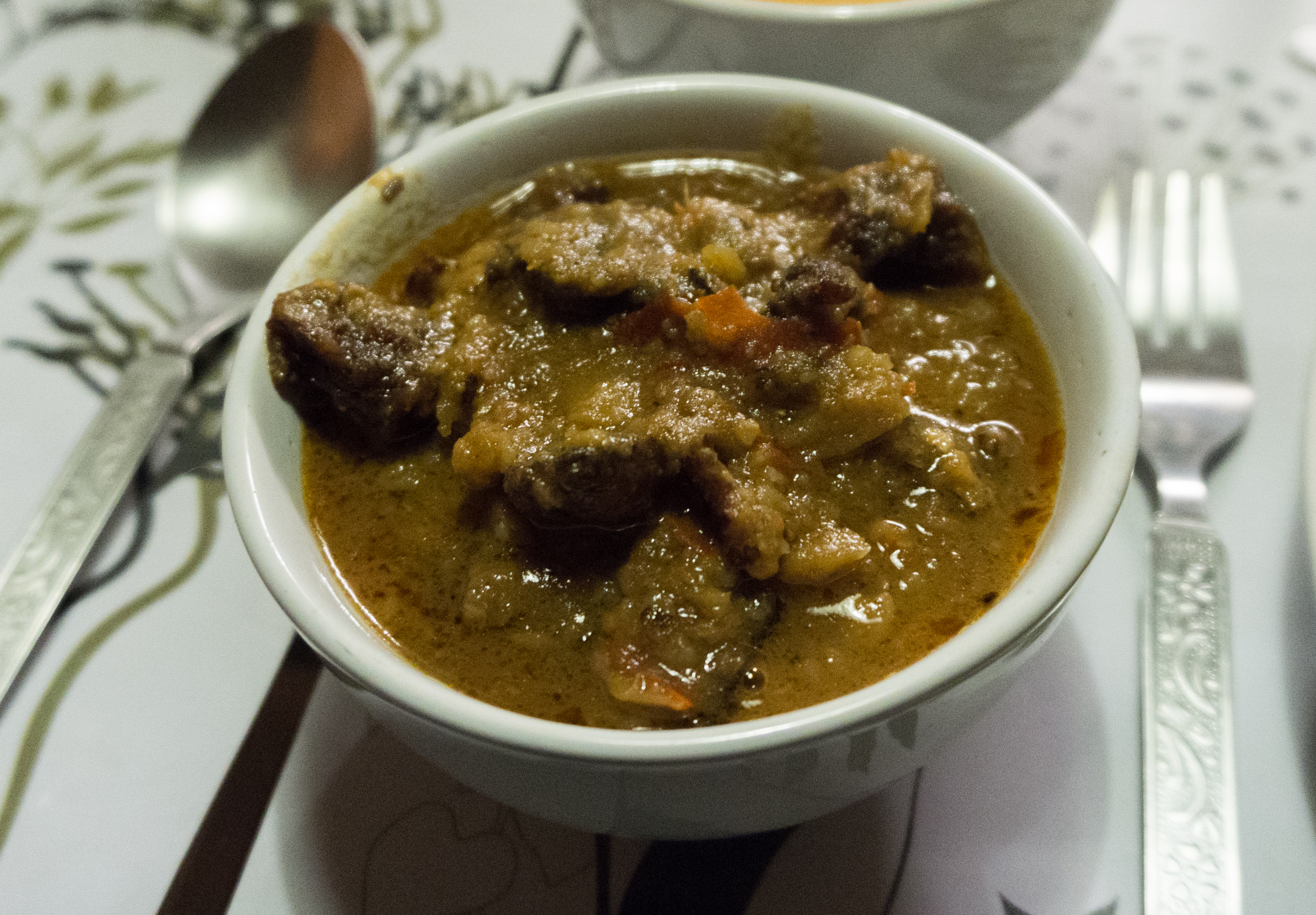
Smoked pork with akhuni

- Akhuni (axone), a fermented soybean product often served with smoked pork and beef. It is a Sümi Naga speciality.
- Akibiye is a thick gravy made with colocasia and bamboo shoots, mainly by the Sümi Nagas.
- Anishi are fermented taro leaves made into patties and then smoked over the fire or sun-dried. It is an Ao Naga speciality.
- Fermented bamboo shoots, locally known as bastenga, are made from tender shoots of the bamboo tree and often served with fish and pork. It is prepared most notably by the Lotha Nagas.
- Dog meat is a delicacy among Nagas. It is used in various dishes.
- Galho, also known as zawo, a common Angami and Chakhesang Naga speciality, is made from a mixture of rice, vegetables and various meats.
- Mesü is a meat dish cooked with its blood. Usually made of pork or beef, it is popular among the Angamis.
- Smoked meat is produced by keeping the meat above a fire or hanging on the kitchen wall for a day to two weeks or longer.
- Yongchak (Parkia speciosa) are long treebeans often eaten roasted over coals, and are often traded in bunches.

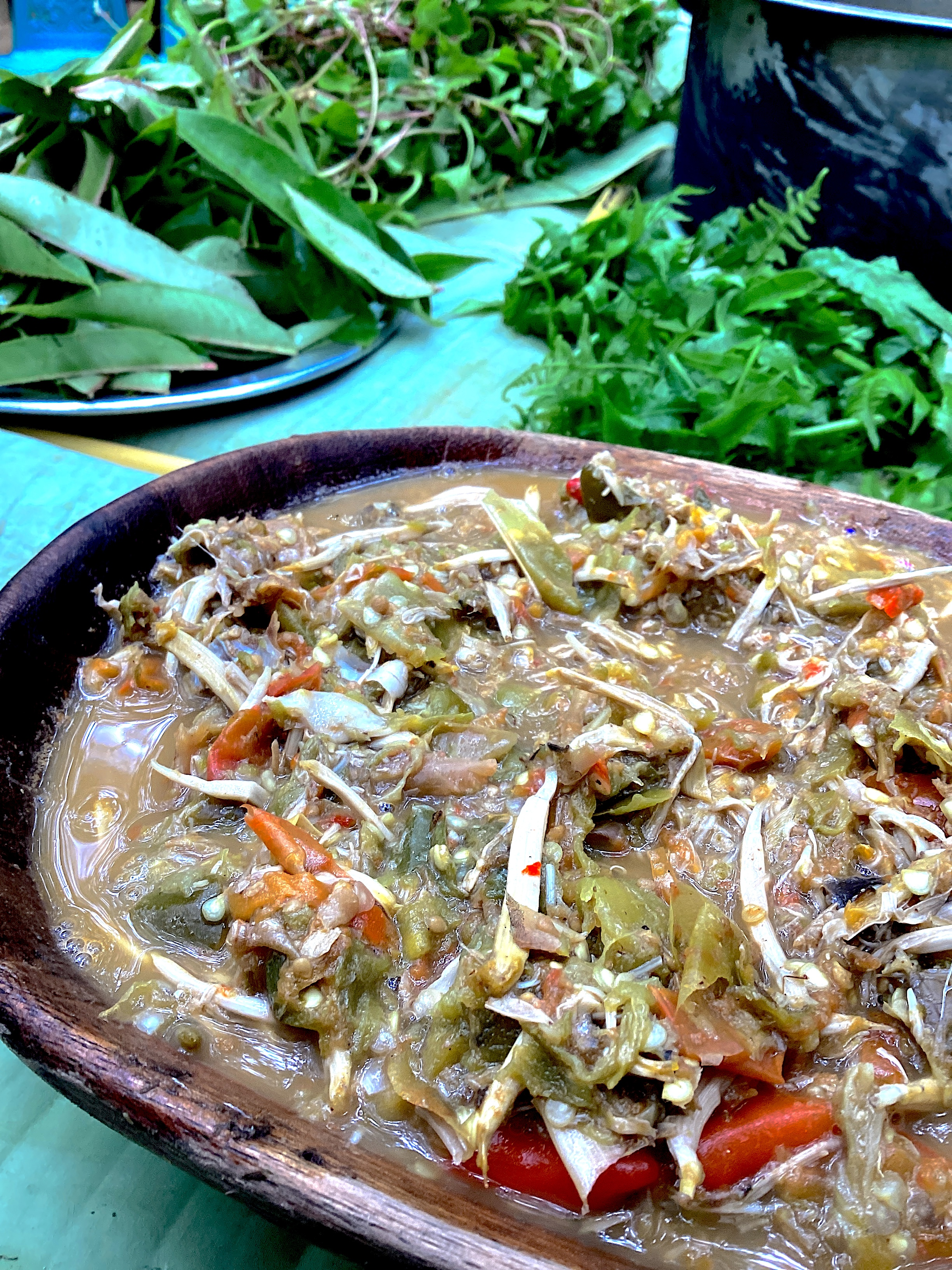
Lotha Naga chutney, Machiha

== Beverages ==
- Thuthse is a fermented drink made from sticky rice. It is the traditional drink of the Angami and Chakhesang Nagas.
- Zutho is another fermented drink made from rice. It has a light and dull taste compared to thuthse, which is thicker, stronger and sweeter.

== See also ==
- Rovi Chasie (2003, expanded 2023), Naga Cuisine: Ethnic Flavours.
