= Nicholas Kharkongor =

Indian film director

- Born: Nicholas Kharkongor; Shillong, Meghalaya, India
- Education: St. Edmund's College, Shillong
- Occupation: Film director
- Years active: 2012–present

Nicholas Kharkongor is an Indian film director and writer. He made his directorial debut with the 2016 crowdfunded film Mantra followed by the popular 2019 film Axone.

== Early life ==
Nicholas Kharkongor was born and raised in Mokokchung, Nagaland, to a Ao father and Khasi mother, and later moved to Shillong, Meghalaya. He graduated in Economics from St. Edmund's College, Shillong, and then went to IIM Calcutta. After loathing studying Management, he dropped out halfway through the course to pursue a career in the arts.

He moved to Delhi and worked with many theatre groups as a writer and director. Later, he moved to Mumbai to pursue film.

== Career ==
He wrote and directed his first film Mantra in 2016. It was a crowdfunded film made on a shoestring budget. Starring Rajat Kapoor, Kalki Koechlin, and Adil Hussain, Mantra premiered at the MAMI Mumbai Film Festival and won Best Film at the South Asian International Film Festival, New York.

His second film, Axone, premiered at the BFI London Film Festival in 2018 and was then picked up by Netflix. It starred Sayani Gupta, Vinay Pathak, and a slew of Northeast Indian actors. It was nominated for Best Story and Best Screenplay at the SWA Awards, winning in the Best Story category.

In 2024, he wrote and directed Jhansi Ka Rajkumar, starring Gulshan Devaiah, Namita Dubey, and Sunita Rajwar. In 2026, he directed the Amazon Prime series, Maa Ka Sum, starring Mona Singh, Mihir Ahuja, and Ranveer Brar.

== Filmography ==
Year	Title	Notes
2016	Mantra	
2019	Axone	
2024	Jhansi Ka Rajkumar	
2026	Maa Ka Sum	web series
