= Gundruk =

Nepali fermented vegetable dish

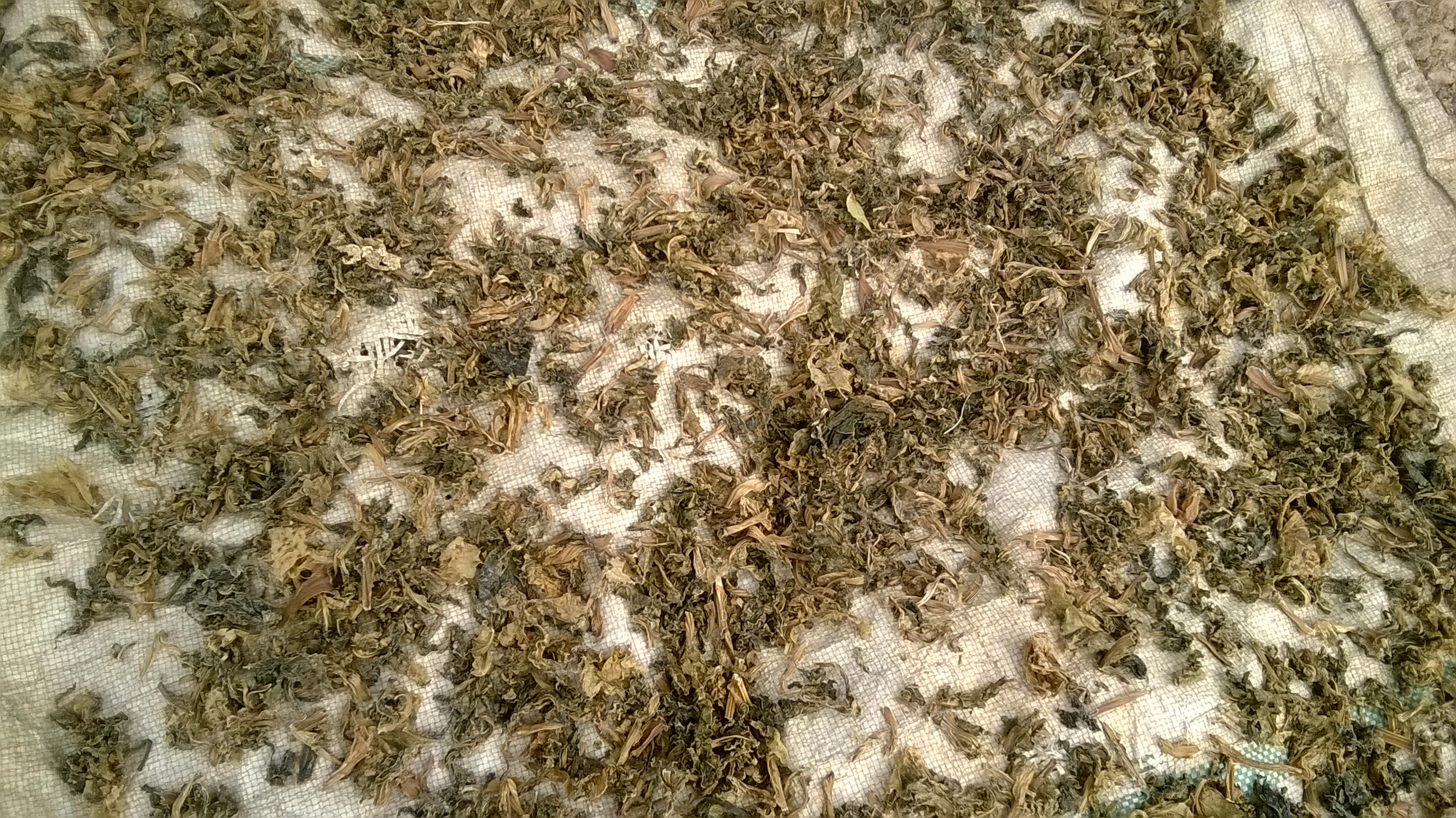
- Gundruk left out in the sun to dry
- Place of origin: Nepal
- Region or state: Nepal; Sikkim; Darjeeling; Kalimpong
- Main ingredients: Leafy parts of radish, cauliflower; root of radish

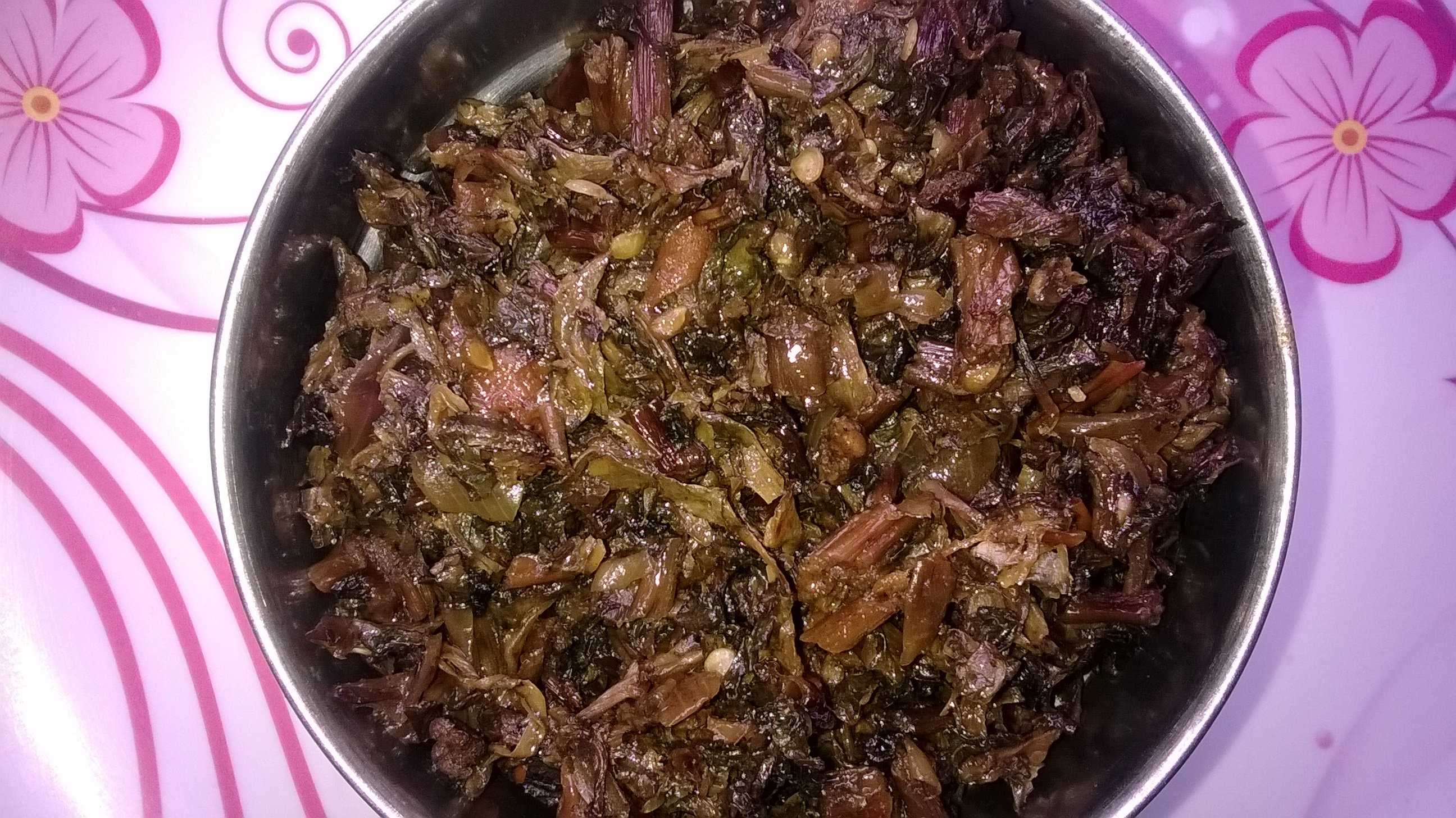
Gundruk achar

Gundruk (Nepali: गुन्द्रुक pronounced [ɡund̪ruk]) is a dish made of fermented leafy green vegetables (saag; Nepali: साग), originating in Nepal. It is also popular in Sikkim and other regions of India, as well as in Bhutan and Myanmar. Annual production of gundruk in Nepal is estimated at 2,000 tons, most of it at the household level.

Gundruk is served as a side dish or as an appetizer. It is an important source of minerals, particularly during the off-season, when local diets mostly consist of starchy tubers and maize, which tend to be low in minerals.

== Preparation ==
In the months of October and November, during the harvest of the first broad mustard, radish, and cauliflower leaves, large quantities of leaves accumulate—much more than can be consumed fresh. These leaves are allowed to wilt for one or two days before being shredded with a knife or sickle.

In addition to the leaves, the roots of radishes can also be added. The shredded leaves are tightly packed in an earthenware container, and warm water (at about 30 °C) is added, entirely submerging the contents. The pot is then kept in a warm place. After a week, a mild acidic taste indicates the end of fermentation, and the contents are removed and dried in the sun. This process is similar to the production of sauerkraut or kimchi, except that no salt is added to the shredded leaves before the start of fermentation.

The ambient temperature at the time of fermentation is about 18 °C. Pediococcus and Lactobacillus species are the predominant microorganisms active during gundruk fermentation. During this process, the pH drops slowly to a final value of 4.0, and the amount of acid (such as lactic acid) increases to about 1% on the sixth day.

It has been found that a disadvantage of the traditional process of gundruk fermentation is the loss of 90% of carotenoids, probably during sun-drying. Improved methods of drying might reduce this vitamin loss.

== See also ==
- Sinki
- Masaura
- Kinema
- Pickled mustard greens
- Meigan cai
