= Anishi =

Anishi (also known as Nüoshi) is a Ao Naga delicacy made of fermented leaves of the Colocasia genus.

To make anishi, taro leaves are wrapped in gunny bags or banana leaves for about 3-4 days before being ground into a paste, typically with salt and other spices, then pressed into cakes and smoked over a fire or dried by the sun, forming black discs.

It is used with pork both as a condiment and a preservative by the Ao Naga tribe of the Indian state of Nagaland.
