= Sinki (food) =

Nepalese dish

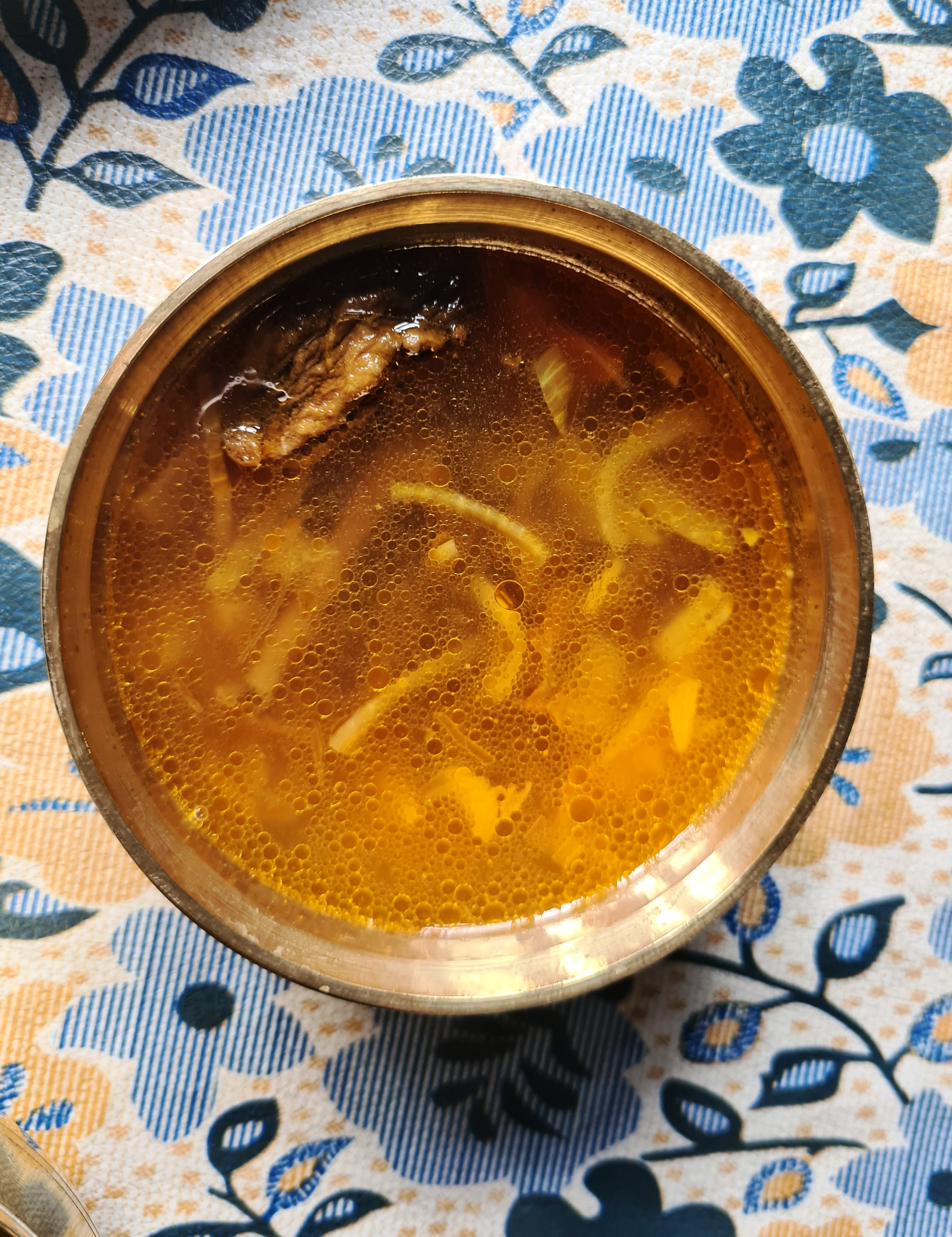
- Sinki jhol (soup)
- Type: Fermented vegetable
- Place of origin: Bhutan; Nepal
- Region or state: Nepal, Darjeeling district, Sikkim
- Main ingredients: Radish that has been fermented by lactobacillus

Sinki (Nepali: सिन्की) is a Nepali preserved fermented vegetable, similar to gundruk. Gundruk is prepared from leafy vegetables but sinki is prepared from radish tap roots.

To make this generations-old indigenous dish, aged radish slivers are pressed into a hole lined with bamboo and straw, then coffined by a cover of vegetation, rocks, wood and, finally, mud. After a month of bacterial curing, the resulting preserved vegetable is dried in the sun and stored to last a few years or more.

== Processing and preparation ==
The process making sinki starts by allowing the radishes to wilt for a few days. Then the leafy tops are cut off and the radish tap-root sections are shredded. If there is a large amount of radishes to process, rather than shredding by hand, a dhiki is usually used to break them up. If the sinki will be made into a pickle after fermentation, instead of shredding, the radish is just cut up. Meanwhile, a 2– to 3–foot (0.6– to 0.9-metre) hole is dug, and a small fire is built at the bottom just before the storage period begins to warm it up.

After the hole is hot enough, the fire is extinguished and the bottom is lined with bamboo and straw. On top of this goes the radishes, which are then pressed down firmly with more vegetation, boards, rocks and mud to create a mostly air-tight barrier. It takes twenty to thirty days for the sinki to properly ferment by a series of lactic acids. Then finally, before it can be eaten, the sinki is dried in the sun.

== Consumption ==
A common dish that utilizes sinki is a simple soup made by first soaking the fermented radishes in water for about 10 minutes, while chopped vegetables like onion, tomato and chili peppers are sauteed in oil with the strained radish slivers, with just a little salt and turmeric powder. This soup, which is commonly served with white rice, is made by adding water and cooking the vegetables for another 10 minutes until all the ingredients are fully tender.

Sinki is also consumed as a pickle. To prepare the pickle, the sinki is not dried. Instead it is directly mixed with spices and bottled.

== Benefits ==
Sinki is considered good for digestion and helps to cure diarrhea and stomach pains.

== See also ==
- Masaura
- Kinema
