= Masaura =

Nepali fermented food

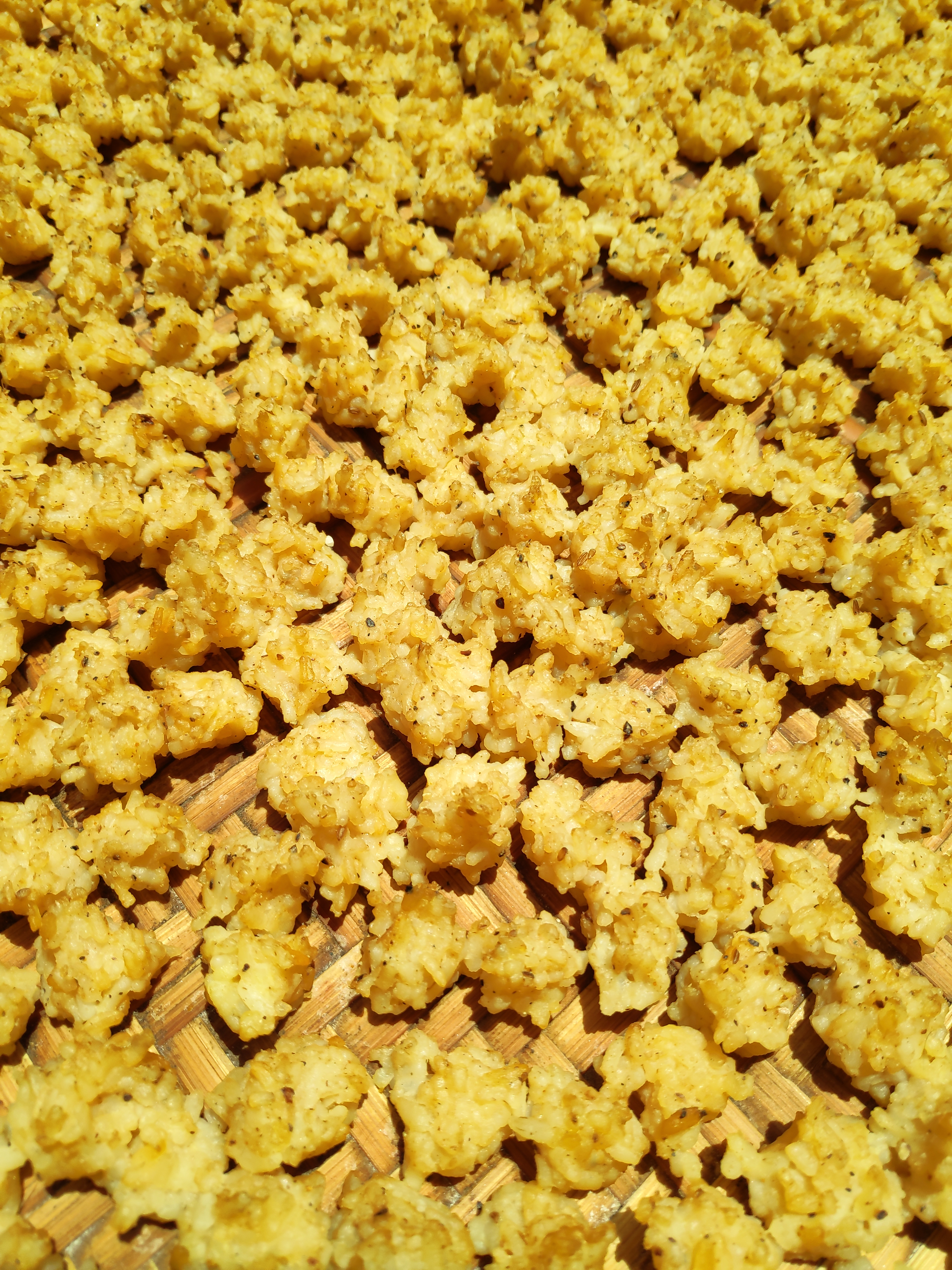
- Uncooked masaura nuggets
- Alternative names: Masyaura
- Type: Fermented dish
- Place of origin: Nepal
- Associated cuisine: Nepalese

Masaura, or masyaura (Nepali: मस्यौरा), are fermented, sun-dried vegetable balls made with a combination of one or several minced vegetables, together with black lentils. They originate in Nepal and are made by the Nepali diaspora throughout the world. The choice of vegetables is mostly taro, yam, and colocasia leaf. As finding fresh vegetables was difficult in earlier times, masaura became an alternative source of nutrition. Masaura is fried in oil and made into a curry.

== Etymology and history ==
A clear history of the dish or its name is lacking, but Nepalese people believe it to be derived from the word for black lentils, maas.

== Gallery ==
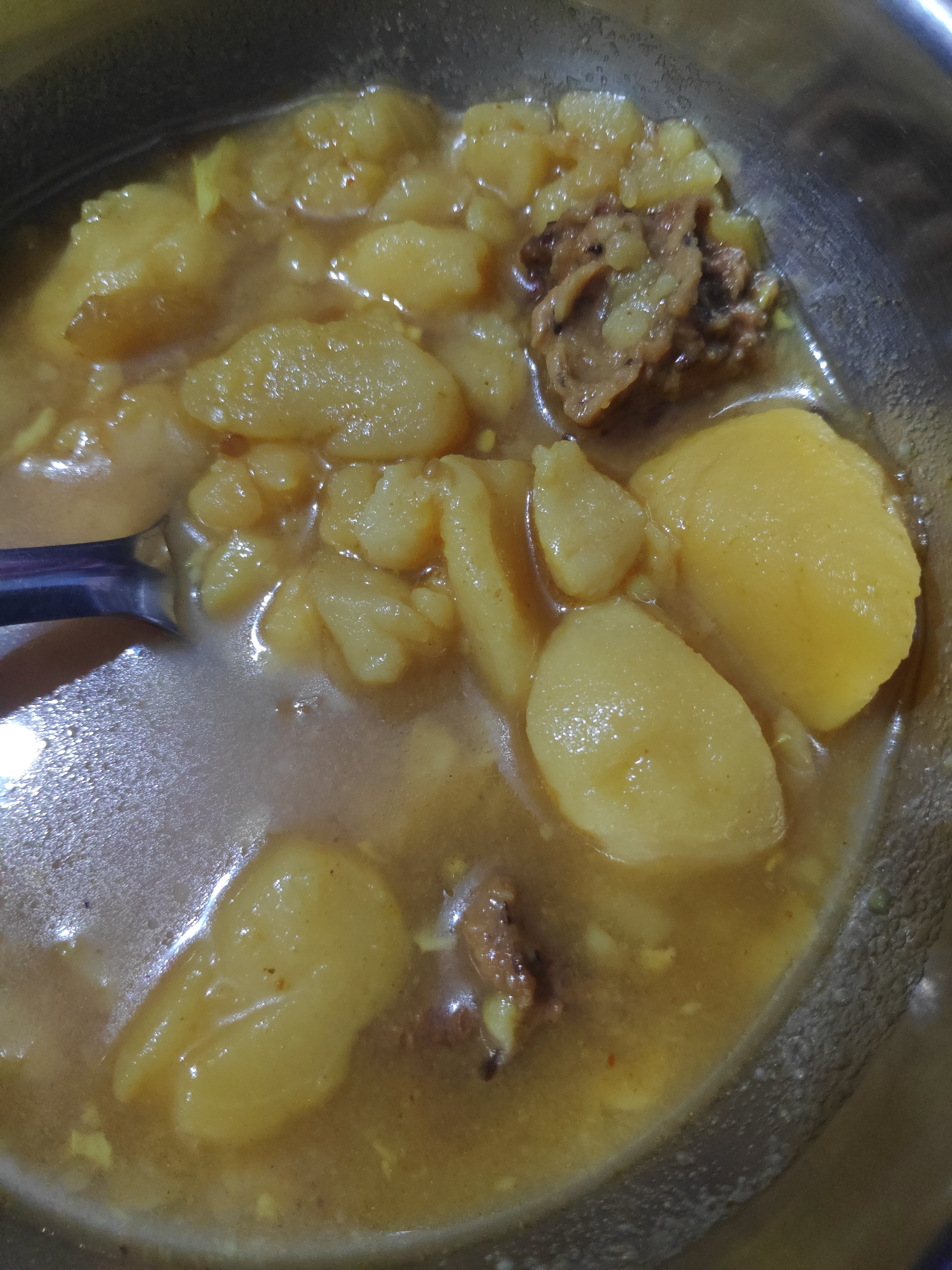
Masaura soup with potatoes

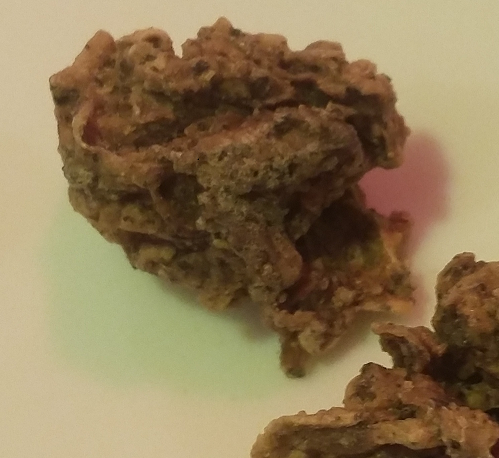
Close-up look of masaura nugget

== See also ==
- Gundruk
- Sinki
