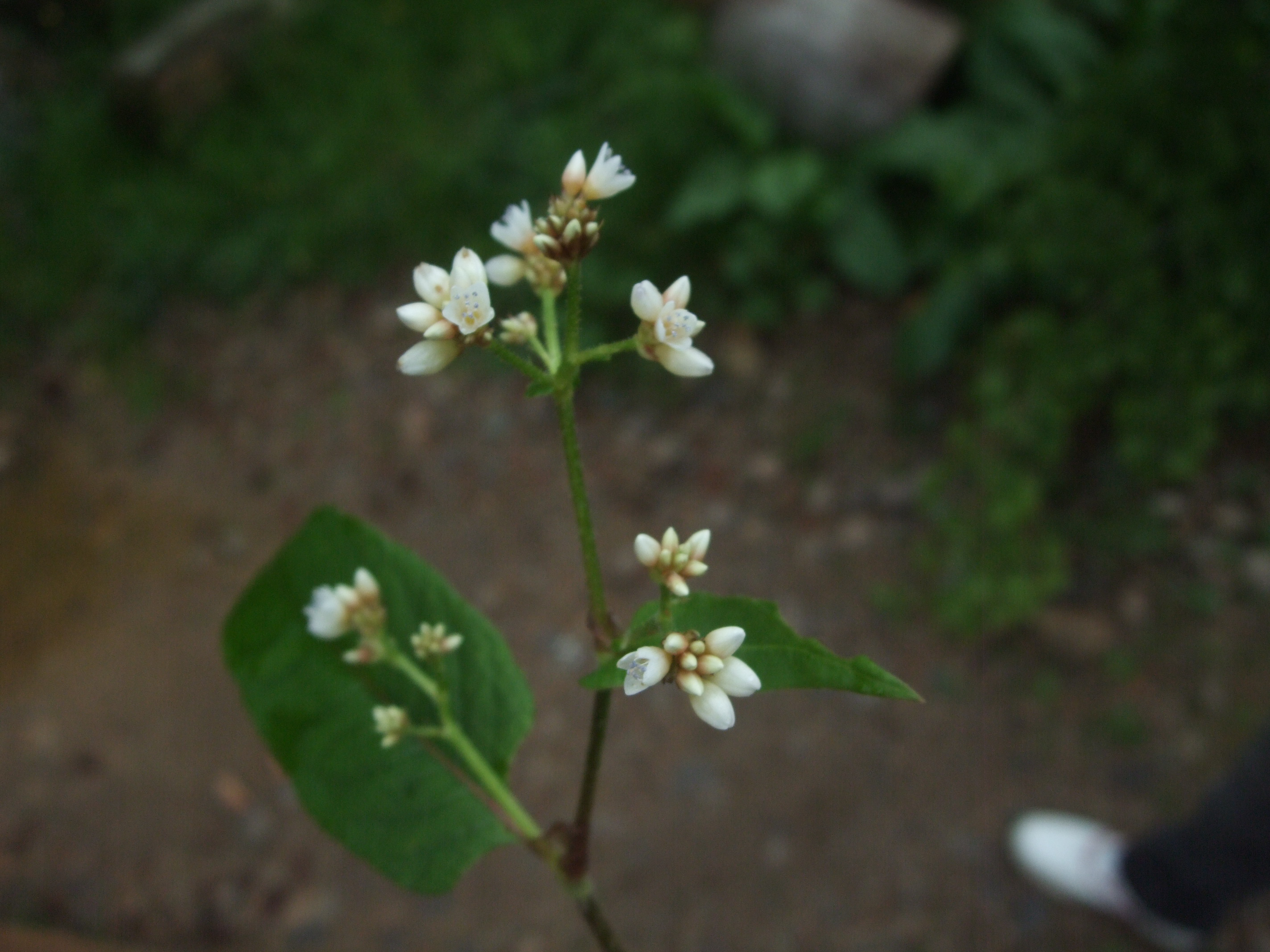

Scientific classification
- Kingdom: Plantae
- Clade: Tracheophytes
- Clade: Angiosperms
- Clade: Eudicots
- Order: Caryophyllales
- Family: Polygonaceae
- Genus: Persicaria
- Species: P. chinensis

Binomial name
- Persicaria chinensis L. H.Gross

Synonyms
- Ampelygonum chinense (L.) Lindl.; Ampelygonum umbellatum (Houtt.) Masam.; Coccoloba indica Wight ex Meisn.; Persicaria umbellata (Houtt.) Nakai; Polygonum auriculatum Meisn.; Polygonum chinense L.; Polygonum densiflorum Blume; Polygonum umbellatum (Houtt.) Koidz.; Rumex umbellatus Houtt.

= Persicaria chinensis =

Species of plant

Persicaria chinensis (synonym Polygonum chinense), commonly known as creeping smartweed or Chinese knotweed, is a plant species from the family Polygonaceae. It is widespread across China, Japan, the Indian Subcontinent, Indonesia, Malaysia, and Vietnam.

== Description ==
Persicaria chinensis is a perennial climber that grows to 2–3 m high. Its stems are glabrous and red-brown, with longitudinal stripes. Its leaves have oval blades, are 4–8 cm long and 3–5 cm wide, with pointed apex and round or nearly cordate base. Its cymes emerge at terminals, and are 5–7 cm long, with small white or pink flowers. Its fruits are berries, globose in shape and enclosed in the enlarged and fleshy calyx at maturity. They are edible and sour tasting. The seeds are small and black.

== In local culture ==
It is a common plant in Malaysia and Vietnam, where it is used in herbal remedies, such as for the treatment of dysentery, enteritis, and sore throat. It is a weed in some coastal areas of New South Wales and Queensland in Australia. In Nagaland it is called garélie in Angami language.
