= Street Alcohol Fighter =

South Korean web television series

- The title card for Street Alcohol Fighter
- Hangul: 술트리트 파이터
- RR: Sulteuriteu paiteo
- MR: Sult'ŭrit'ŭ p'ait'ŏ
- Genre: Entertainment; Variety
- Written by: Jo Yoon-sun; Jeon Hye-ji
- Directed by: Moon Jeong-seon; Koo Kyung-hye; Jo Yoon-hye; Kim Hyung-tae; Lee Yoo-rin; Han Dong-hyeop
- Presented by: Kim Hee-chul
- Country of origin: South Korea
- Original language: Korean
- No. of seasons: 2
- No. of episodes: 43

Production
- Producer: Park Han-jin
- Camera setup: Multi-camera
- Running time: 15 – 23 minutes
- Production company: Studio Hook

Original release
- Network: YouTube
- Release: 11 November 2021 – 17 November 2022

Street Alcohol Fighter (Korean: 술트리트 파이터; RR: Sulteuriteu paiteo), often abbreviated as SAF is a South Korean variety web show hosted by South Korean singer-songwriter and presenter Kim Hee-chul. The program aired every Thursday at 8 pm KST on YouTube. The primary notion is that celebrities are interviewed by Kim while consuming alcoholic beverages.

== Rule ==
Before filming Street Alcohol Fighter, each guest was asked about their alcohol tolerance. The main objective of the show is for the guest to enjoy drinking.

Drinking games

Current drinking games
- Juryeonggu game: Starting season 2, this game is played at the end of the episode.
Former drinking games
- Druken lucky drawing board: The guest has to talk and do the mission with the topic selected from the drawing board. If the player fails, the player has to drink.
- Play the requested song!: When the alcohol kicks in, the guest can request some songs to listen to.
- Sing our song request: The staff request some songs for the guest to sing.
- Cyworld 100 questions, 100 answers: The player needs to match their past answers to a set of 100 questions they once answered.
- Alcohol preference test: A game of this or that where players choose between two things they prefer.
- Guess the slang that the MZ generation use. The loser needs to drink in 'one-shot'. When both player didn't answer, both players need to drink half a glass.
- Heebab Quiz: The player has to answer questions related to Heebab, and answer them correctly.
- Talk Tree: It is a game where players have to pick a card from a miniature Christmas tree and answer the question.
- Chunsam Gang Boss Takeover: The game has 3 parts, a nonsense game to test your quickness, a harmonica game to test mental power, and a hand movement game to test your endurance level. The winner will be the Chunsam gang boss for the day.
- Street Woman Fighter's Drunk Random Draw: It is a game where players have to choose a note from several sticky notes and answer the question behind it.
- United Dance: The players have to make the same pose based on the title of the song. A sticker will be removed if the player succeeded. If the player failed, the penalty is to drink the beverage.
- The person who put the cap closest to the beer bottle, wins. The price of the game is a box of Tsingtao beer.
- Guilty Pleasure Song: The player has to write the guilty pleasure song they listen to now.
- Draw Straws: It is a game where players have to pick straws and answer a question.
- Obviously game: For 1 minute, the player has to play the Draw straws game. When the alarm rings, the player has to drink.
- Miniefield Jenga: Each player takes turns removing one block from any level below the highest completed one and placing it horizontally atop the tower, perpendicular to any blocks on which it is to rest, and answering the question behind it. The penalty is given to the player who can't answer it, drink a glass of whisky and if the Jenga falls, the player gets a pankin' (spanking).
- This member remembers: It is a game where the players have to guess the song title and the member in 20 seconds from a blurred picture of a music video. A sticker will be removed if the player succeeded.
- Do not do the lucky draw: The player has to turn a lever of non-coin-operated machine to receive questions or missions.
- Groundless Debate: Each player will pick 1 out of 3 random stances. Each stance has a topic that the staff has provided. The player has to defend his stance to win. The winner will be decided by the staff vote.
- Friendship Test: The player has to call their members (Super Junior and Infinite Challenge) and pass the phone immediately to the other person, that person should continue the conversation without getting caught. The one who last longer wins.
- SaBF (Street Alcohol Brand Fighter): By listening to the alcohol advertising slogan, the player has to guess what brand it is. If the player failed, the penalty is to drink the beverage.
- Spooner Karaoke: The player has to sing based on the word given and use Terra spoon as a microphone. The player who fails must drink.
- Conversation Picking game: It is a game where players have to choose a note from several sticky notes and answer the question behind it. The question or mission was provided by the fans of Sing Again 2.
- Best Singer Again: The players have to pick a terra spoon that contains the order of the performance behind it. The person with the highest score will be the best singer and receive various Alcohol Street Fighter merchandise from Terra and Jinro, and a bluetooth karaoke machine.
- Lyrics Fighter: It is a game where Sechs Kies' lyrics were played through Google Translate (English, Chinese, the player have to guess the title of the song. If Kim See-chul wins, he gets to add one liquor shape sticker however if the guest (Eun Ji-won and Jang Su-won from Sechs Kies) win, the guest get to keep the sticker to themselves and will not be added to the 13 Million Won Alcohol Challenge.
- Poongja's ideal type World Cup: A game where Poongja choose between 6 artist as he/she's ideal type.
- No Way Yes: A glass of alcohol is placed in the middle of two players, when a player loses (meaning he says yes), the glass moves one step to his ground but when the player says no, the glass moves away one step towards the opponents' ground.
- Balance game: It is a game where the guest was given two options to choose.
- Mala Level Jenga: Each player takes turns removing one block from any level below the highest completed one and placing it horizontally atop the tower, perpendicular to any blocks on which it is to rest, and answer the questions written behind it. If it falls, the person must dance to a song without music.
- Song Lyric Emoji Quiz: It is a game where the players have to guess the song title, the singer and the verse corresponding to the emoji. The winner will get a premium alcohol.
- SM TMI Quiz: This quiz is for the four generations of SM artist (Kangta (H.O.T), Heechul (Super Junior), Xiumin (Exo) and Doyoung (NCT 127)) regarding TMI of SM artist. For the player who get the most correct answers, the staff production will play their 30s promotional video of their recent release album.
- K-pop Record game: After hearing the name of the K-pop singer, each player have to sing and dance differently. If the song overlaps, the player has to drink.
- Ranking game: This game requires the players to choose a tagger. The tagger will have to wear a headband and the person sitting on the left of the tagger will choose a topic and a number (1-6) without the tagger knowing. The tagger will rank the players according to the topic, if the player is ranked at the chosen number, the player has to drink.
- Catch Me If You Can: It is a game to test the player's tipsiness by catching a chopstick from dropping.

== Series overview ==
| Series | Episodes | Originally released | |
| Series | Episodes | First released | Last released |
|---|---|---|---|
| 1 | 20 | 11 November 2021 | 31 March 2022 |
| Sing Again 2 | | 14 April 2022 | 15 April 2022 |
| 2 | 21 | 16 June 2022 | 17 November 2022 |

== Episodes ==
=== Season 1 ===
| No. overall | No. in season | Guest(s) | Alcoholic drink | Location | Original release date |
|---|---|---|---|---|---|
| 1 | 1 | - | - | - | 11 November 2021 |
| 2 | 2 | Jun Jin (Shinhwa) | Craft beer | Beer Post Bar, Seoul | 18 November 2021 |
| 3 | 3 | Jung Eun-ji and Lee Sun-bin | Somaek | Hongik University Station | 25 November 2021 |
| 4 | 4 | Jung Eun-ji and Lee Sun-bin | Somaek and coffee soju (Note: The recipe for coffee soju requires 9 cups of soju and 1 iced black coffee.) | Hongik University Station | 2 December 2021 |
Voice appearances through phone by Choi Si-won and Han Sun-hwa (episode 3).
| 5 | 5 | Mithra Jin (Note: In episode 5 season 1, Mithra Jin introduced Kao maek recipe which is the combination of kaoliang liquor and beer.) | Kaoliang and beer | Jeil-Yang, Apgujeong-dong | 9 December 2021 |
| 6 | 6 | Yerin | Vodka cocktail | Schedule, Apgujeong-dong | 16 December 2021 |
| 7 | 7 | Heebab | Cheongju | Jeong Yong-guk Beef Intestine, Gangnam | 23 December 2021 |
| 8 | 8 | Queen Wa$abii | Jim Beam Highball | Chelsea's Highball, Gangnam | 30 December 2021 |
| 9 | 9 | Oh Hyun-min and Jonathan Yombi | Soju | Gun Hee | 6 January 2022 |
Special appearance: Apgujeong-dong
| 10 | 10 | - | - | Seoul Diguet House, Gahoe-dong | 13 January 2022 |
Special episode for completing the Alcohol Superstar Challenge
| 11 | 11 | Ji Sang-ryeol | Sikhye | Seoul Diguet House, Gahoe-dong | 20 January 2022 |
Special episode for completing the Alcohol Superstar Challenge. Voice appearances through phone by DinDin.
| 12 | 12 | Choi Hyo-jin and Park Hea-been (Peanut) | Tsingtao beer | Jang-Gang, Incheon | 27 January 2022 |
| 13 | 13 | Choi Hyo-jin and Park Hea-been (Peanut) | Tsingtao beer | Jang-Gang, Incheon | 10 February 2022 |
Episode 12 was a special episode for completing the Alcohol Superstar Challenge. Moana makes a special appearance in episode 13.
| 14 | 14 | Jaejae and Aiki | Bokbunja-ju; Red makgeolli | Izakaya Junmu, Mullae-dong | 17 February 2022 |
| 15 | 15 | Jaejae and Aiki | Bokbunja-ju; Red makgeolli | Izakaya Junmu, Mullae-dong | 24 February 2022 |
| 16 | 16 | Choi Si-won and Shindong (Super Junior) | Whisky | Vassment One, Apgujeong-dong | 3 March 2022 |
| 17 | 17 | Choi Si-won and Shindong (Super Junior) | Whisky | Vassment One, Apgujeong-dong | 10 March 2022 |
Voice appearances through phone by Eunhyuk (episode 16).
| 18 | 18 | Seungyoon and Jinwoo (Winner) | LG Homebrew craft beer | Street Alcohol Fighter House | 17 March 2022 |
| 19 | 19 | Seungyoon and Jinwoo (Winner) | Ballantine's Blended Scotch whiskies | Street Alcohol Fighter House | 24 March 2022 |
Voice appearances through phone by Hyunsuk in episode 19.
| 20 | 20 | Jeong Jun-ha | Jeju Omegi Malgeunsul | Apgujeong-dong | 31 March 2022 |
Voice appearances through phone by Shindong, Kim Hee-sun and Park Myung-soo.

=== Sing Again 2 special ===
| No. | Title | Top 3 Sing Again 2 contestants | Alcoholic drink | Judge | Original release date |
|---|---|---|---|---|---|
| 21 | Top 3 can sing and drink! | Kim Ki-tae, Kim So-yeon and Yoonsang | Terra and Jinro soju | Kyuhyun | 15 April 2022 |
Yoonsung: "Fate" by Yoonsung; Kim So-yeon: "Alone People by Lee Chong-son; Kim Ki-tae: "It's Not Love If If Hurts Too Much" by Kim Kwang-seok
| 22 | Top 3 who drank 12 bottles of somaek and slayed live singing | Kim Ki-tae, Kim So-yeon and Yoonsang | Terra and Jinro soju | Kyuhyun | 15 April 2022 |
Kyuhyun (81 points) - "A Shot of Soju" by Im Chang-jung; Yoonsung (82 points) - "The Aria of Sad Soul" by Kim Kyung-ho; Kim Ki-tae (75 points) - "Yeon" by Kim Yoon-ah; Kim Hee-chul (73 points) - "Like Rain, Like Music" by Lee Seung-chul Kim So-yeon (68 points) - "I Hate You" by Choi Jung-in

=== Season 2 ===
| No. overall | No. in season | Guest(s) | Alcoholic drink | Location | Original release date |
|---|---|---|---|---|---|
| 23 | 1 | Eun Ji-won (Note: In episode 1 season 2, Eun Ji-won introduced the 'Eun Ji-won Soju' recipe which is a combination of 2/3 soju and a glass of mineral water.) and Jang Su-won (Sechs Kies) | Jinro soju | Soolpan, Bukgajwa-dong | 16 June 2022 |
| 24 | 2 | Eun Ji-won (Sechs Kies) | Jinro soju | Soolpan, Bukgajwa-dong | 23 June 2022 |
| 25 | 3 | Poongja | Sake | Dangsangod, Yeongdeungpo | 30 June 2022 |
| 26 | 4 | Poongja and Heebab | Craft beer | Saenghwal Maekju, Yongsan | 7 July 2022 |
| 27 | 5 | Minsu and Lara (Enjoy Couple) | Makgeolli | Seongsu-dong | 14 July 2022 |
Voice appearances through phone by Rowoon.
| 28 | 6 | Aespa | Cocktail and TAMS Zero | Waves, Mullae-dong | 21 July 2022 |
| 29 | 7 | Aespa | Cocktail and TAMS Zero | Waves, Mullae-dong | 28 July 2022 |
| 30 | 8 | Jay Park and MVP | Won soju | TBA | 4 August 2022 |
| 31 | 9 | Jay Park and MVP | Won soju | TBA | 11 August 2022 |
| 32 | 10 | Kim Hae-jun, Lee Yong-joo and Na Bo-ram | Windsor whiskey | I Am A Singer 7090 Live, Hwagok-dong | 18 August 2022 |
| 33 | 11 | Honey J, Jane and Lo-A | Kaoliang tonic (Note: The recipe for Kaoliang tonic is a combination of Kaoliang and tonic water with the ratio 1:2. It has high level of alcohol but sweet in flavour.) | Yongyong Seonsang, Seolleung | 25 August 2022 |
| 34 | 12 | Honey J, Jane and Lo-A | Kaoliang tonic | Yongyong Seonsang, Seolleung | 1 September 2022 |
| 35 | 13 | Rowoon | Hwayo soju | Nonhyeon-dong, Seoul | 15 September 2022 |
| 36 | 14 | Kangta (H.O.T), Xiumin (Exo) and Doyoung (NCT 127) | Jinro soju | Konkuk University Street | 22 September 2022 |
| 37 | 15 | Kangta (H.O.T), Xiumin (Exo) and Doyoung (NCT 127) | Jinro soju | Konkuk University Street | 29 September 2022 |
| 38 | 16 | Chungha and Rian | Sparkling Cheongha | Kill the YouTube, Ewha Womans University | 6 October 2022 |
| 39 | 17 | (G)I-dle | Bombay Sapphire gin, Jim Beam Highball and Hwayo soju | Mullae-dong | 13 October 2022 |
| 40 | 18 | (G)I-dle | Bombay Sapphire gin, Jim Beam Highball and Hwayo soju | Mullae-dong | 30 October 2022 |
| 41 | 19 | Ji Sang-ryeol, Seungyoon and Jinwoo (Winner) | Saero soju | Seoul | 27 October 2022 |
| 42 | 20 | Ji Sang-ryeol, Seungyoon and Jinwoo (Winner) | Saero soju | Seoul | 11 November 2022 |
| 43 | 21 | Sung Si-kyung | Beer, Clos de Vougeot and soju | Yeongcheon Younghwa, Cheongdam-dong | 17 November 2022 |

== Alcohol Superstar Challenge ==
Kim Hee-chul needs to collect 50 liquor drop stickers in order to get a 37.5 kg of 24-karat gold cup. The challenge is based on ABV: cheongju 13%, soju 17%, kaoliang liquor 34%, vodka 40%, Jim Beam whiskey 40%, Sikhye 41%.

- 1 sticker = 1 bottle of soju
- 1 sticker = 3 bottles of beer
- 1 sticker = 4 glasses of vodka cocktail
- 2 stickers = 1 bottle of kaoliang
- 2 stickers = 3 bottles of cheongju
- 1 sticker = 2 mugs of Jim Beam whiskey

=== Season 1 ===
| No. | Guest(s) | Stickers added |
|---|---|---|
| 2 | Jun Jin | 2 |
| 3 | Jung Eun-ji and Lee Sun-bin | 6 |
| 4 | Jung Eun-ji and Lee Sun-bin | 6 |
| 5 | Mithra Jin | 11 |
In episode 5, Kim gets a sticker whenever, he or the guest answered correctly during the Cyworld 100 questions, 100 answers game.
| 6 | Yerin | 3 |
In episode 6, Kim and Yerin get 2 stickers if they did a 'love shot' and 'bottoms up' while drinking an espresso martini.
| 7 | Heebab | 7 |
| 8 | Queen Wa$abii | 7 |
| 9 | Oh Hyun-min, Jonathan Yombi and Gun Hee | 2 |
Total: 50 liquor drop stickers

==== Reverse Challenge ====
This challenge is a spin-off of the Alcohol Superstar Challenge where Kim Hee-chul gets to remove 50 stickers that he collected previously without calculating the alcohol percentage. The rule of the challenge is to remove 1 sticker for one bottle. By completing this challenge, Kim will received another 37.5 kg of 24-karat gold cup.

| No. | Guest(s) | Stickers removed |
|---|---|---|
| 12 | Choi Hyo-jin, Park Hea-been (Peanut) and Moana | 16 |
| 13 | Choi Hyo-jin, Park Hea-been (Peanut) and Moana | 16 |
| 14 | Jaejae and Aiki | 7 |
| 15 | Jaejae and Aiki | 7 |
| 16 | Choi Si-won and Shindong (Super Junior) | 4.5 |
| 17 | Choi Si-won and Shindong (Super Junior) | 4.5 |
| 18 | Seungyoon and Jinwoo (Winner) | 19.5 |
| 19 | Seungyoon and Jinwoo (Winner) | 19.5 |
| 20 | Jeong Jun-ha | 2 |
Total: 50 liquor drop stickers were removed

=== Season 2 ===
In season 2, the challenge was renamed as The 13 million Won Wine Challenge. Kim needs to collect 135 liquor drop stickers in order to get the same amount of the 13 million won wine volume. In episode one of season one, the price the wine was 14,214,050 Korean won. If Kim fails, the other remaining volume will be given to the staff of the show. Kim managed to collect 121 out of 135 liquor drop stickers, 78ml (after round up 77.8ml) are given to the production staff.

| No. | Guest(s) | Stickers added |
|---|---|---|
| 1 | Eun Ji-won and Jang Su-won (Sechs Kies) | 10 |
| 2 | Eun Ji-won and Jang Su-won (Sechs Kies) | 10 |
| 3 | Poongja | 13 |
| 4 | Poongja and Heebab | 13 |
| 5 | Minsu and Lara (Enjoy Couple) | 5 |
| 6 | Aespa | 18 |
| 7 | Aespa | 18 |
| 8 | Jay Park and MVP | 8 |
| 9 | Jay Park and MVP | 8 |
| 10 | Kim Hae-jun, Lee Yong-joo and Na Bo-ram | 3 |
| 11 | Honey J, Jane and Lo-A | 6 |
| 12 | Honey J, Jane and Lo-A | 6 |
| 13 | Rowoon | 7 |
| 14 | Kangta (H.O.T), Xiumin (Exo) and Doyoung (NCT 127) | 13 |
| 15 | Kangta (H.O.T), Xiumin (Exo) and Doyoung (NCT 127) | 13 |
| 16 | Chungha and Rian | 17 |
| 17 | (G)I-dle | 9 |
| 18 | (G)I-dle | 9 |
| 19 | Ji Sang-ryeol, Seungyoon and Jinwoo | 12 |
| 20 | Ji Sang-ryeol, Seungyoon and Jinwoo | 12 |
Total: 121 liquor drop stickers

== Sponsorships ==
Street Alcohol Fighter openly displays its engagement in product placement within the show. In episode 7, the show received its first sponsorships from Haroutine, a 100% plant-based multivitamin pill. In episode 8, Jim Beam became their first alcoholic beverage sponsor. Other products appear throughout the show are CJ Condition hangover helper, Tsingtao beer, LG Homebrew beer machine, HK inno.N hangover jelly stick, sparking hangover drink Kaesukang, Won soju and Taylor Prunes.
