= Beopju =

Rice wine

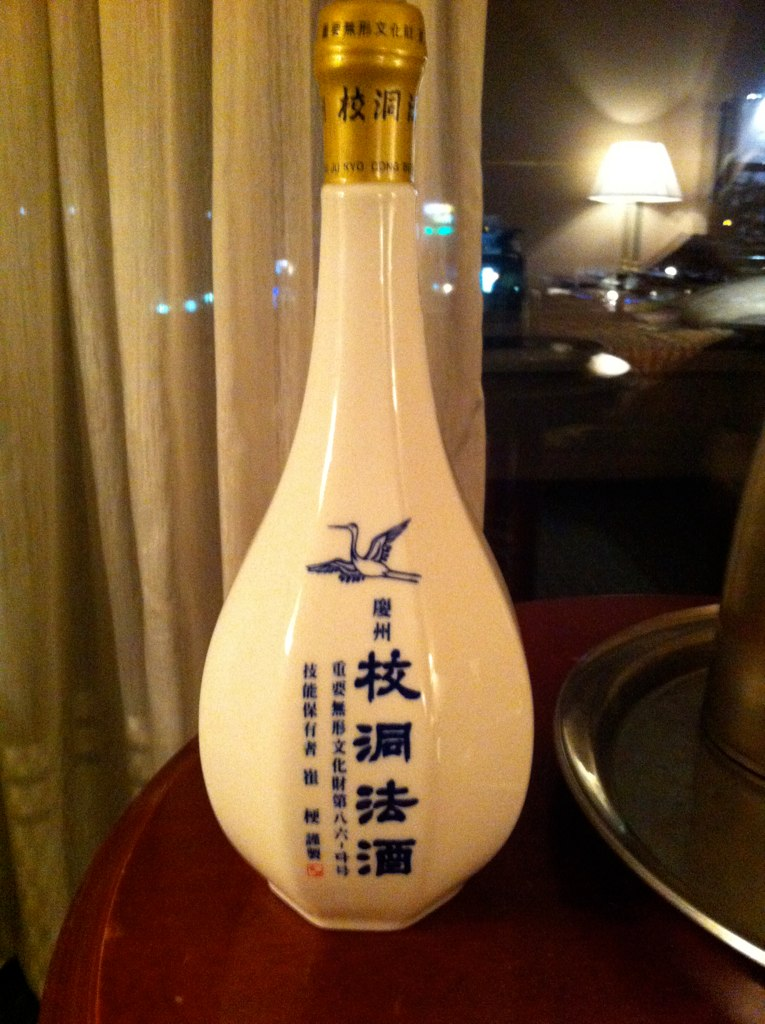
- A bottle of Gyodong-beopju
- Type: Cheongju
- Origin: Korea, East Asia
- Alcohol by volume: 16‒18%

Korean name
- Hangul: 법주
- Hanja: 法酒
- RR: beopju
- MR: pŏpchu
- IPA: pʌp̚.t͈ɕu

Beopju (Korean: 법주; Hanja: 法酒) is a type of cheongju (clear rice wine). The name literally means "law liquor", as it is made following a fixed procedure. On 1 November 1986, a variety called Gyodong-beopju was designated by the government of South Korea as Intangible Cultural Property (No. 86-3).

== History ==
Beopju is mentioned in Illustrated Account of Goryeo, a 1124 book written by a Song Chinese envoy to Goryeo and Goryeosa, a 1451 Joseon book on history. Originally, it referred to the rice wines made with non-glutinous rice, for official or administrative use, such as for Jongmyo jerye (royal ancestral rite). Later, it also referred to the rice wines made around Buddhist temples.

Today, the variety called Gyodong-beopju, brewed with glutinous rice in the head-house of Gyerim Choe clan in Gyo-dong, Gyeongju, North Gyeongsang Province, is renowned. The variety was first made by Choe Gukjun, a Joseon official who worked at Saongwon, the government office in charge of royal kitchen. He was chambong, a hands-on manager in charge of surasang (royal table). After retirement, he returned to his home in Gyeongju and brewed beopju. The recipe was handed down in the Gyerim Choe clan, currently to Bae Young-shin, a daughter-in-law married to the eighth generation grandson of Choe Gukjun, and her eldest son Choe Gyeong.

== Preparation ==
Gyodong-beopju is brewed from September to April. It is made only with glutinous rice, nuruk (dried fermentation starter) made of wheat, and water. Traditionally, it is fermented for 100 days and has therefore also been called Baekilju ("hundred days liquor").

Water quality should be considered, and the process begins with boiling and cooling the water. Some recipes add goji root to the glutinous rice and nuruk to create the liquor base. Steaming the glutinous rice makes sticky rice which is added to a second fermentation at low temperature for a lengthy period of time, followed by a 100-day aging process.

== See also ==
- Munbae-ju
- Korean alcoholic beverages
