= Korean alcoholic beverages =

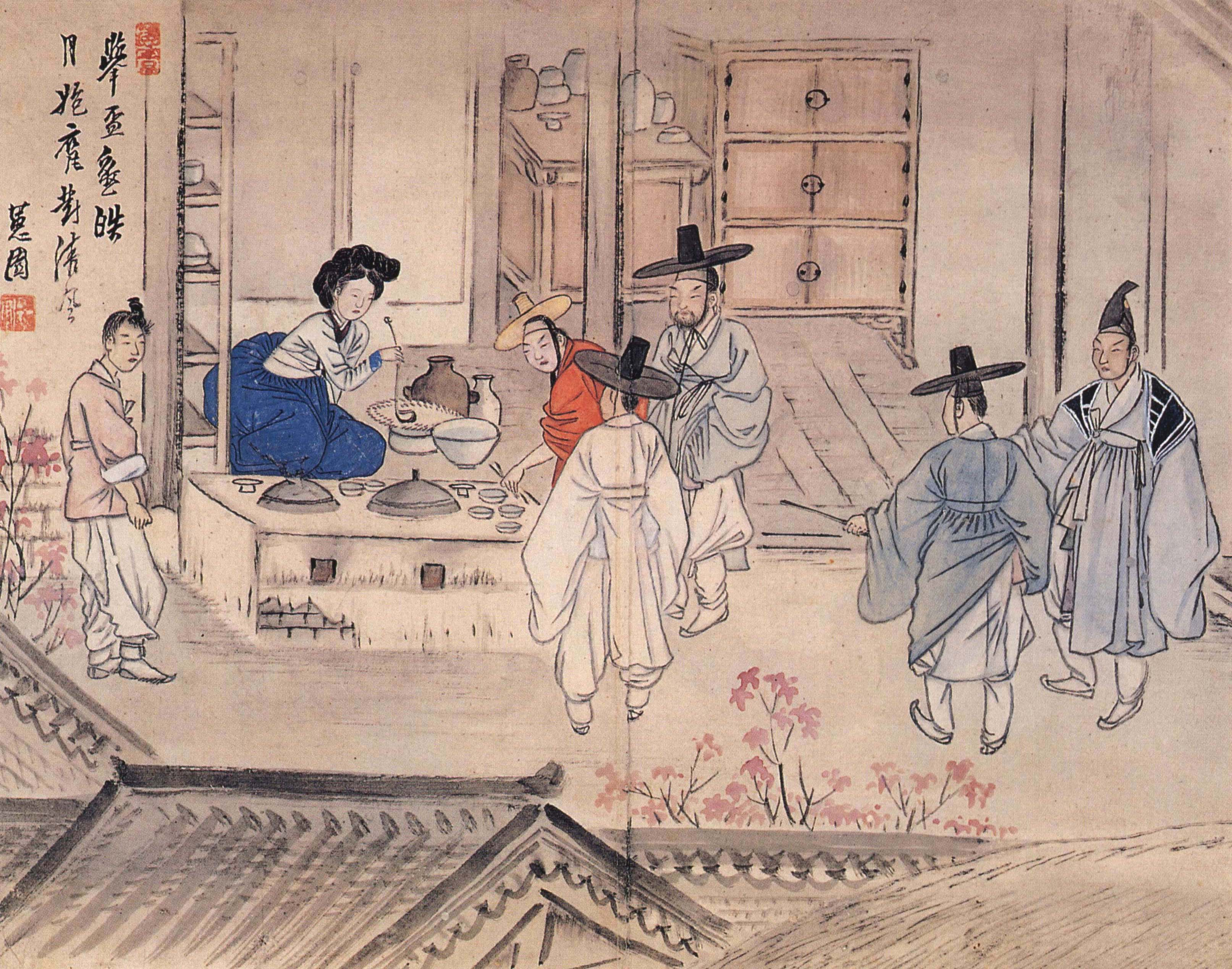
- Jusageobae (holding a drinking party) by Hyewon (1758–1813)

Korean name
- Hangul: 술
- RR: sul
- MR: sul
- IPA: [sʰul]

Suffixes
- Hangul: -술; -주
- Hanja: (none); -酒
- RR: -sul; -ju
- MR: -sul; -chu
- IPA: [sʰul]; [tɕu]

Korean cuisine has a wide variety of traditional alcoholic drinks, known as sul (술). Many of these drinks end with the Sino-Korean word -ju (주; 酒), and some end with the native Korean word -sul. The Sino-Korean -ju is not used as an independent noun.

There are an estimated 1,000 or more kinds of alcoholic drinks in Korea. Most are made from rice, and are fermented with the aid of yeast and nuruk (a wheat-based source of the enzyme amylase). Fruits, flowers, herbs, and other natural ingredients have also been used to craft traditional Korean alcoholic drinks. There are six distinct flavors: sweet, sour, pungent, roasted, bitter, and spicy. When the flavors are balanced, the alcohol is considered of good quality.

== Etymology ==
There are several hypotheses regarding the origin of the word Sul, for one it is thought to have come from Chinese characters or Su-eul meaning Korean milk porridge (Korean word Tarakjuk). It can be understood that Sul must have derived from the fermentation of leftover milk porridge. The most prominent origin for the word comes from boiling appearance while fermentation, as if fire was coming out of water and thus combining Korean word for fire-Bul and water-Su abbreviate over time to become Sul.

== History ==
=== Mythology ===
The first story of alcohol appeared in Jewang-Ungi, a Korean historical archive book.

=== Goguryeo kingdom ===
The records compiled in 1145, Samguk sagi (history of the Three Kingdoms) is one of the oldest record of Sul. The presence of Sul was given out in a story about the founding of the kingdom, Goguryeo. The story when translated to English: "Haemosu, the son of the god of heaven invited the three daughters of Habaek, a water deity, and treated them to Sul. When the three daughters were about to return home, he seduced the eldest daughter, Yuhwa, and they spent the night together. Thereafter, Yuhwa gave birth to Jumong, the future founder of Goguryeo."

Archaeological study indicates that there are records that show that these brewing skills and techniques were learned by Chinese and Silla dynasty; during the Wei dynasty of China, the governor Gasahyop of the Sadong region transferred the techniques to China and the liquor came to be known as Gokaju.

=== Baekje ===
There are records that show that these brewing skills and techniques were learned by Japanese from Baekje; Gosagi an old Japanese book on historical stories notes that the brewing techniques were transferred from Baekje to Japan by Inbeon, the emperor enjoyed the drink along with singing & dancing which earned him the name "liquor deity".

=== Silla ===
Records show that Goguryeo's Sul brewing skills and techniques were learned and transferred to Silla kingdom and came to be known as poets’ drink. Jibung Yuseol, a Silla text, provides evidence of sul brewing techniques and traditions. By the time of the unification of The Three Kingdoms, Silla had developed methods and traditions for distillation and soon sul become common and popular among the upper class.

=== Goryeo Dynasty ===
During Goryeo Dynasty (918–1392), the brewers had developed new and perfected techniques for brewing methods for grain alcohols. Seo Geung, a Sung Dynasty China ambassador mentioned about the trades and characteristics of methods constituents and effects of Sul in his book about Korea. Dongui Bogam and Boncho Gangmok, archived medical texts shows evidence of distillation techniques and practices transferred from outside of Korea.

Buddhist temples had the ability & recourses to make Sul. They served and sold liquors in their inns; state run public drinking houses boosted new currency circulation, haedong tongbo and this in turn contributed to the increase of taverns. Sul of the highest quality for ceremonies, national celebrations were made in Yangonseo, special building in palaces. During the Goryeo Dynasty many types of liquor came into existence, categorised into several groups mainly takju- a thick rice wine, gwasilju-a fruity wine, soju- a distilled spirit and cheongju- a clear rice wine.

=== Joseon Dynasty ===
During the Joseon period (1392–1910), private families' home brewers developed techniques to make liquor of highest quality and hence this era saw the peak of Sul culture and its technical advancement. In 1610 compilation of Dongui bogam, an exemplar of Korean Medicine helped in the creation of a new liquor using medicinal herb. During this time period Sojutgori, a type of distiller for soju boosted the production of Soju and thus its consumption. Soju had become so popular in Joseon Dynasty it was thought to deplete nation's food supply, due to this a famous scholar and politician Jeong Yakyong suggested the king to confiscate the distillers from common people and thus preserve rice. In contrast to that the rich and the aristocratic society consumed luxury alcohols. During this period, the country had developed indigenous liquor with its distinct characteristics by region. Soju for the northern region, Yakju for the middle region and Takju for the southern region. During the late Joseon, Gwahaju a type of rice wine: where soju a distilled spirit is added to brewed liquor. This was originally done to preserve rice wines during summer.

=== 1910–1945 ===
Before the Japanese colonial rule, Sul was brewed in small scale at home. The new colonial government allowed only licensed brewers to make alcoholic beverages. It issued license to brewers in support of the government and passed a decree levying liquor tax. This resulted in banning home brewing, extinction of thousands of traditional liquors and industrialization of Sul production in Korea. Despite this many Korean households brewed Sul illegally. In 1916 a liquor tax law was adopted to suppress the Korean home brewers. Western drinks like beer, whisky were introduced in Korea and were popular among the wealthy, in the other hand common people still continued consuming traditional Korean beverages.

Liquor tax was still valid even after liberation in 1945. Nuruk production became a concern due to the food shortage because of Korean War and hence in 1965 grain management law was passed which further tightened liquor control. After liberation, Sul production had reached its worst compared to before the period. During this time many traditional recipes were altered and a huge variety of traditional liquor was lost. Many of the techniques, skills and knowledge in the making of Sul were not recorded rather orally transmitted resulting in the loss of traditional home brewing. In 1980, the government lifted some controls on Sul ensuing reappearance of some types of Sul. Late 1980s consideration to designate traditional liquors a state heritage was underway. In 1995 government allowed home brewing.

== Methodology ==
=== Constituents and components ===
Sul is made of nuruk. Nuruk is a Korean equivalent to barley malt used in brewing beer in the west. It is a dough made from grain germinated by enzyme-releasing microorganisms and hence a fermentation starter for the whole process of brewing alcoholic beverages. It gives the flavors, color, and fragrance, thus a determining factor for the result of Sul produced.

The key ingredients needed to make Nuruk are culture medium and microbes. In a culture medium made of grains such as rice, wheat, and barley; microbes like fungi and bacteria are germinated. Depending on the color of the fungi used nuruk obtains its specific color, fungi can be categorized based that into three kinds, they are: Monascus purpureus which is reddish, Aspergillus oryzae which is brownish in color and Aspergillus Niger which is blackish. Out of these for making the Korean liquor the principal Nuruk used is the brownish variation. The determining factors for fermentation are humidity and favorable temperature which instigates better fungi culture formation on, uruk. The traditional way of making Nuruk requires ground wheat to be mixed with water transferred to a mold and pressed to obtain the desired shape. Thereafter hung in the kitchen or a room and turned a few times, it then would take about 12–20 days to ferment the dough. To get the best result with a fresh scent and clear color sul, a well-cultured Nuruk is essential. Nuruk originating from different regions in Korea can be determined by their thickness and width; for instance, Nuruk from the mountainous region need to be wide and thin, Nuruk from plains needs to be thick and small, thus Nuruks can be found to have a variety of shapes such as flat disk shape, rectangular, globe-shaped, etc. The use of the apt shape of nuruk affects the germination of fungi and fermentation otherwise might result in low alcohol yield or compromise flavor which in turn results in a temperature increase inside the fermentation jar. Nuruk was used in Korea during The Three Kingdom period, records such as Goryeo Dogyeong by Xu Jing in 1123CE and Hallimbyeolgok from the Goryeo period show that Nuruk was used for making Sul and Korean traditional alcohol was brewed using a special type of Nuruk indication of a variety of Nuruk during that period respectively. A classic text about food in the mid-Joseon period, Gyugonsiuibang(1670) gives names and manufacturing details of traditional Nuruks and also concludes the same. Further, nuruk during the Joseon dynasty was classified into two categories. One is made out of a lump of grain power called Ddeok-nuruk and the other is made out of cereal grains called Heuchim-nuruk. This led to the production of distinct Sul. The use of Ddeok-nuruk gave a rich and complex flavor to the Sul as a variety of microorganisms like fungi, yeasts and lactic acid bacteria could grow thoroughly deep inside the lump. Compared to this when Heuchim-nuruk was used the Sul tasted simple and light since fungi grew only on the surface of the Nuruk. Since the start of using industrial commercial fermentation starters, the use of Nuruk had declined rapidly over the years.

=== Flavor, colour and fragrance ===
Traditional Korean alcohols don't have wide spectrum of colors irrespective to the ingredients added like flowers or grass root or tree barks the result gives very common colors. The color of the best Korean traditional liquor is brighter and deeper golden. Golden color is the best among the different tints, and deep purple is least desirable, whereas amber is second best tint. Apart from the color of the alcohol, transparency is also a key factor to determine its quality. More the transparency that is clearer the beverage better the class rating. Despite using only rice and Nuruk without any other supplements it can showcase fragrance resembling grapes, berries like strawberries, apples, peaches, plum or lotuses. If the process is compromised there is a chance of having unpleasant odor like that of Nuruk fungi, thus it is always desired to let the brewing process undergo several fermentations and give it ample amount of time to avoid undesirable smell. More fermentation and longer maturing is desired to produce better quality with better flavors, colors and fragrance.

== Varieties ==
Most traditional Korean alcoholic drinks are rice wines, fermented with the aid of yeast and nuruk (a wheat-based source of the enzyme amylase). Main varieties include clear rice wines (cheongju), milky rice wine (takju), distilled liquor (soju), fruit wine (gwasil-ju), flower wines, and medicinal wines.

=== Rice wines ===
==== Milky ====
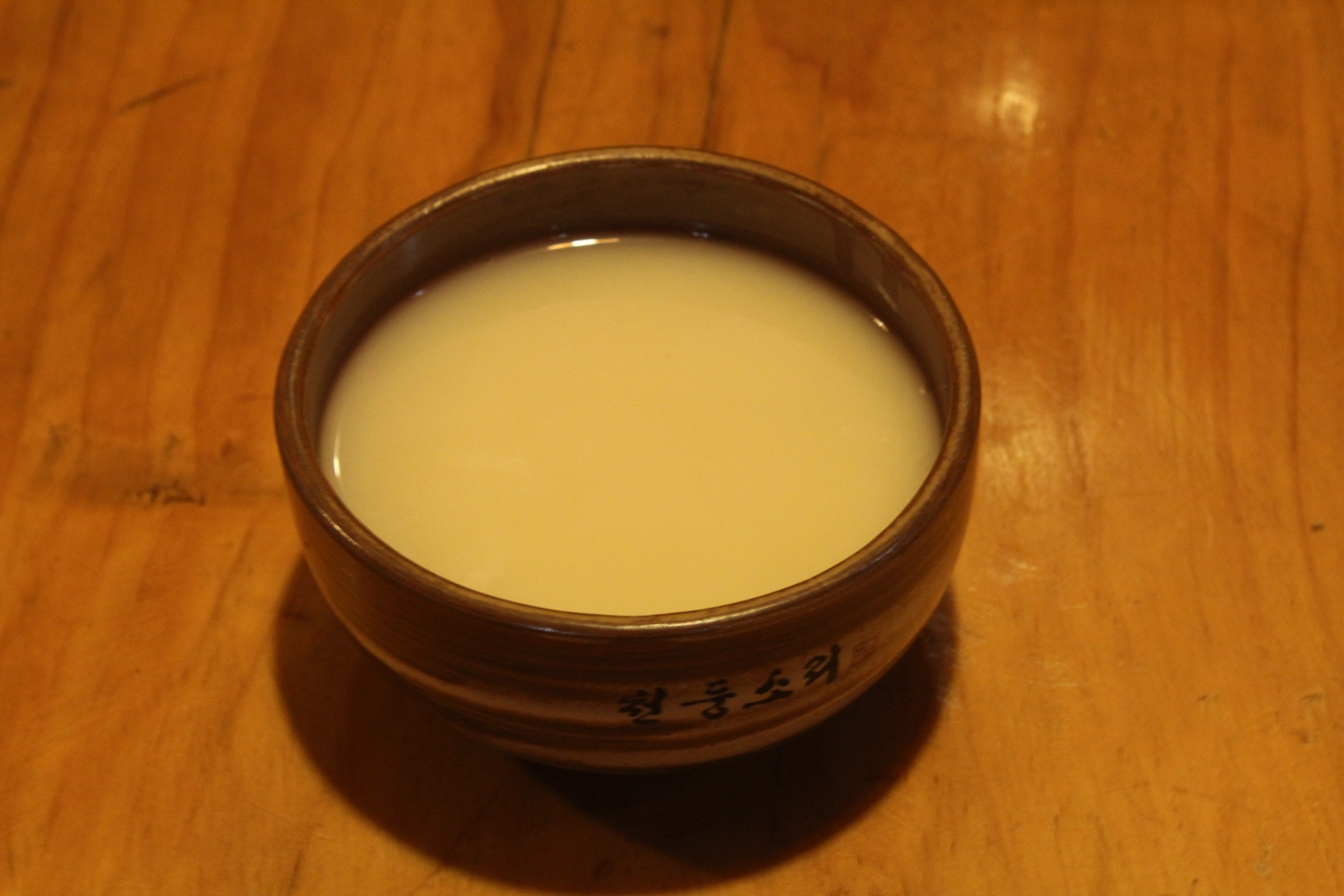
Makgeolli, without rice grains

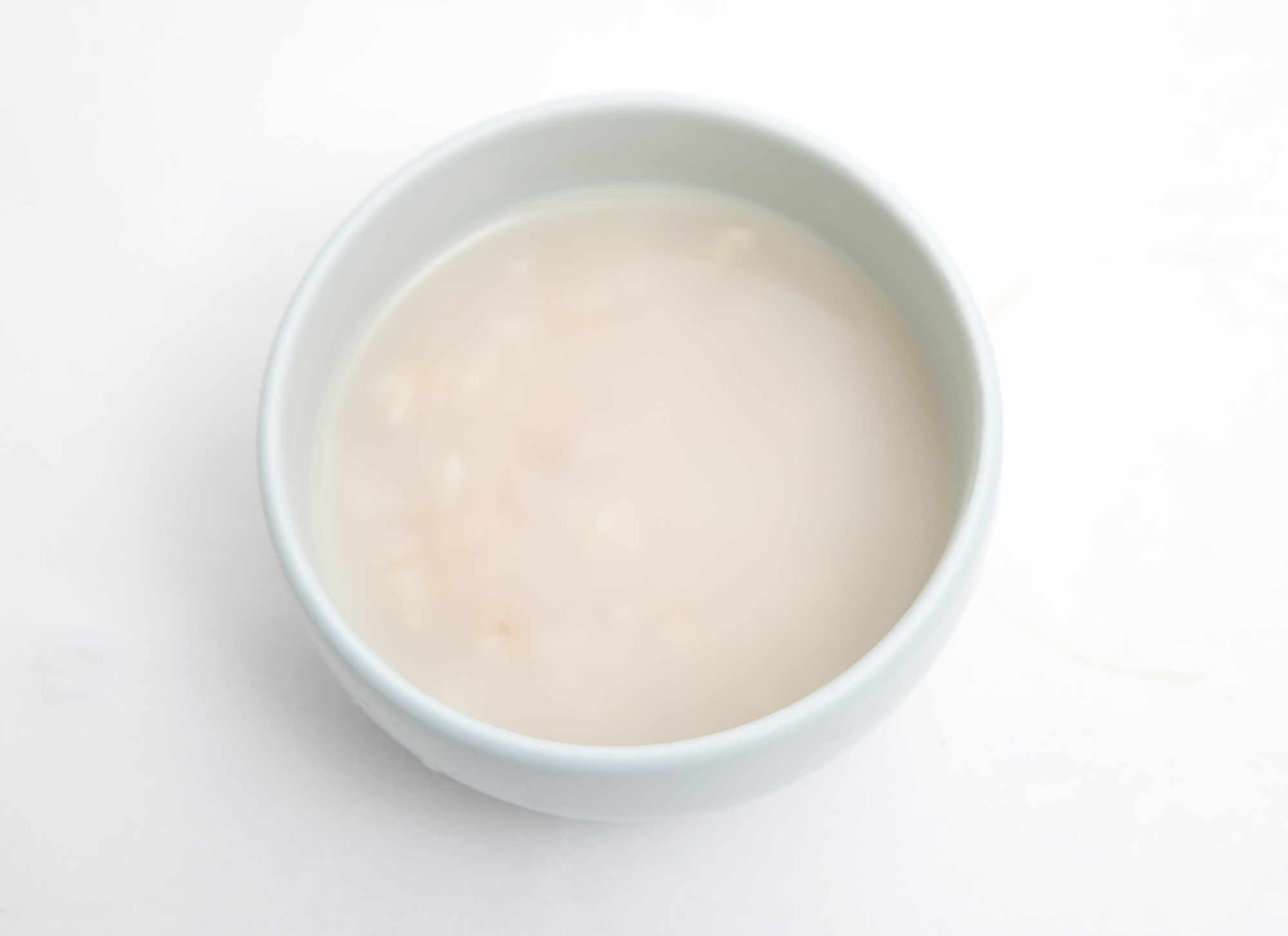
Dongdong-ju, with rice grains

Makgeolli (also known as takju and nongju), is a milky, sweet alcoholic drink made from rice. It is one of Korea's most popular alcoholic drinks. The oldest traditional Korean rice wine, its alcohol content is six to seven percent. It is fermented naturally and not filtered, which gives it its milky-white color and leaves a chalky residue at the bottom. Thick and smooth, it tastes sweet and slightly tangy, with a cool aftertaste. Makgeolli is served in a bowl, rather than a cup.

In Poetic Records of Emperors and Kings, written during the Goryeo dynasty (918–1392), the drink was first mentioned in the founding story of the Goguryeo Kingdom during the reign of King Dongmyeong (37–19 BC). Makgeolli is brewed with classical methods, using nuruk (molded cereal which produces hydrolysable enzymes, decomposing macromolecules to monomers for yeast growth) cooked rice, water, barley and yeast. The brewing process has two steps: seed and main mash and main fermentation. Seed mash is the process of obtaining actively-growing yeasts and enzymes in the mixture of yeast and nuruk. The main mash acquire tastes and aromas from the transformation of nutrients and amino acids derived from the rice. Main fermentation lasts for about a week.

Due to the microorganisms present during fermentation, it contains 1.9 percent protein, over 10 amino acids, vitamin B, inositol and choline. Makgeolli is reported to increase metabolism, relieve fatigue and improve the complexion.

A regional, slightly creamier variant, originally from Gyeonggi Province, is called dongdongju. Another variety, called ihwaju (이화주; 梨花酒; "pear-blossom wine") is so named because it is brewed from rice with rice malt which ferments during the pear-blossom season. Ihwaju is often so thick that it is eaten with a spoon. A similar drink is known as Gamju; this name is also used for non-alcoholic sweet drinks, including Sikhye (식혜).

==== Clear ====
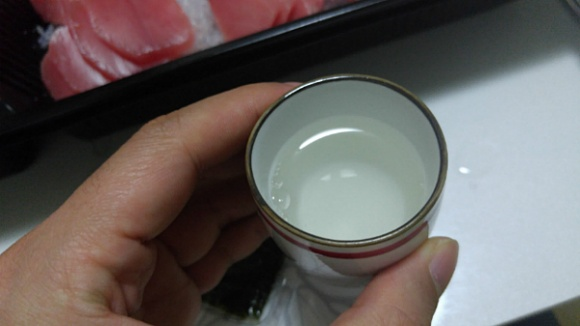
Cheongju (yakju)

Cheongju, or yakju, is a refined rice wine made from steamed rice which has undergone several fermentation stages. Also known as myeongyakju or beopju, it is distinguished from takju by its relative clarity. Varieties include baekhaju (백하주), made from glutinous rice and nuruk, and heukmiju (흑미주; 黑米酒; lit. 'black rice wine'; made from black rice).

Yakju is brewed with boiled rice, yeast, and water. If chrysanthemum is included, it is called gukhwaju; if azalea is added, it is called dugyeonju; if pine sprouts are used, it is called songsunju; if lotus leaves are added, it is called ywonyeopju; if ginseng is used, it is called insamju. Takju and cheongju are sometimes distilled, with medicinal herbs added to the distilled liquor. This mixed liquor is brewed to enhance the medicinal effects of the herbs.

Cheongju is similar to Japanese sake. Chung Ha is a popular brand which is widely available in Korean restaurants. Local variations include beopju, brewed in Gyeongju.

==== Flavoured ====
This yakju is brewed with flowers and leaves for a distinctive flavor. Kookhwaju (chrysanthemum wine), omijaju, songjeolju and dugyeonju are types of gahyanggokju.

A number of Korean traditional wines are produced from flowers. These include wines made from chrysanthemums (gukhwaju), acacia flowers, maesil and peach blossoms, honeysuckle, wild roses, and sweet-briar petals and berries. One famous variety of flower wine, called baekhwaju, is infused with herbs as well as 100 varieties of dried flowers.

Dugyeonju (두견주; 杜鵑酒) is a wine made from azalea petals which is produced in Chungcheong Province. Sweet, viscous and light-yellowish-brown in color, it contains about 21 percent alcohol. Myeoncheon Dugyeonju is the South Korean government's Important Intangible Cultural Property No. 86-2.

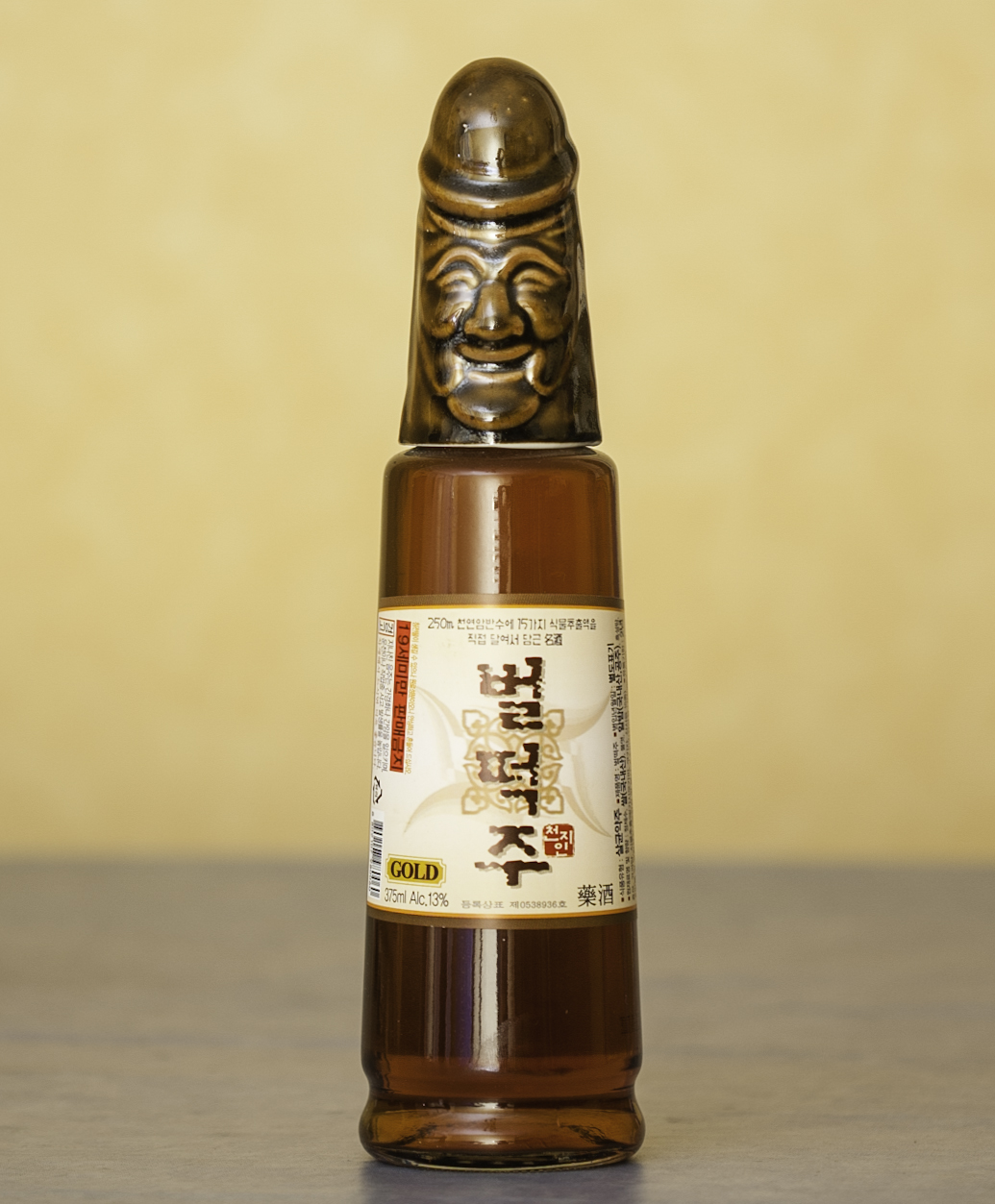
Beolddeok ju rice wine, believed to increase male sexual potency

Medicinal liqueurs, known as yagyongju (약용주; 藥用酒), are produced by combining seeds, herbs and roots with alcohol.

- Baekse-ju (brand name Bek Se Ju), a commercial variant of medicinal wine, is the most popular medicinal wine among younger people (who generally do not drink it for its medicinal properties). It has become a popular alternative to soju in restaurants and bars. Baekse-ju is a rice wine infused with ginseng and eleven other herbs, including licorice, omija (Schisandra chinensis), gugija (Chinese wolfberry), astragalus, ginger and cinnamon, with 13 percent alcohol.
- Bem ju is made by placing a snake in a jar of distilled liquor (such as soju) and aging it. It is a folk remedy that is said to be particularly good for men. Various types of snakes are used. According to local lore, the more venomous the snake, the more powerful the medicinal quality (and the higher the price).
- Beolddeok ju: A rice wine infused with herbal medicines and sweetened with pumpkin malt which is believed to increase male stamina. Bottles are often sold topped with a ceramic penis with a smiling face.
- Chuseongju is a traditional wine made from rice and herbs, including omija (Schisandra chinensis) and Eucommia ulmoides. It is commercially available in a bamboo-shaped bottle.
- Daeipsul (대잎술) is a traditional folk wine from Damyang County in South Jeolla Province made from glutinous and brown rice, bamboo leaves, and ten medicinal herbs.
- Dosoju is a popular herbal wine, traditionally served on New Year's Day.
- Insamju, made with ginseng, is said to be the most popular medicinal wine among older people.
- Jugyeopcheongju is a traditional liquor made with bamboo leaves.
- Ogalpiju is made from the bark of Eleutherococcus sessiliflorus, blended with soju and sugar.
- Sansachun is a commercial Korean wine made from the red fruit of the sansa, or Chinese hawthorn (Crataegus pinnatifida). The Bae Sang Myun Brewery Company markets this wine, claiming therapeutic effects.
- Songsunju is soju made with glutinous rice and soft, immature pine cones or sprouts.

==== Fortified ====
Honju is brewed with grain by adding soju. Gwaha-ju and songsun-ju are types of honju.

=== Distilled liquors ===
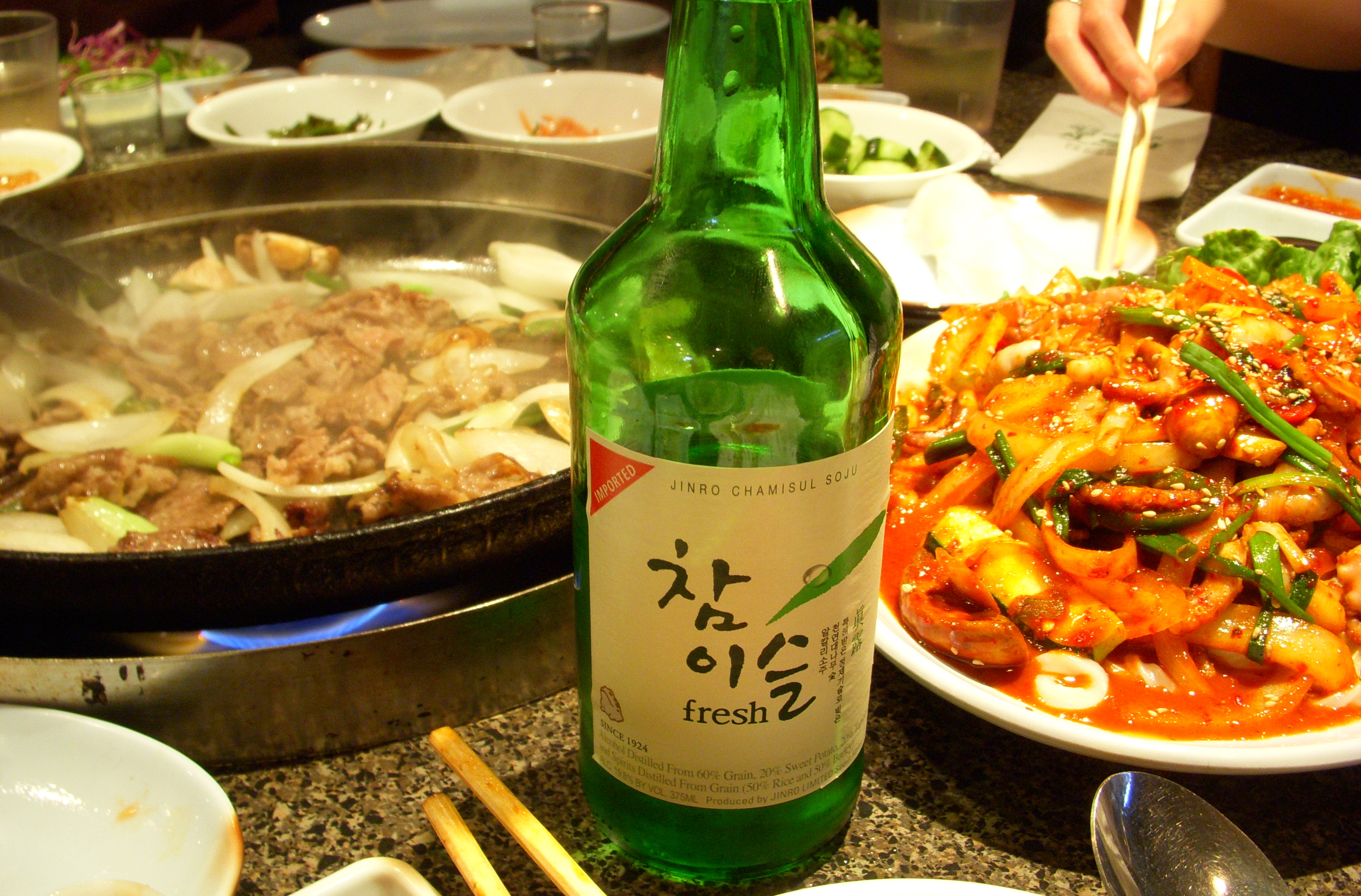
Bottle of Jinro soju

- Hongju, a red liquor made with rice, red gromwell (Lithospermum erythrorhizon), and nuruk. Made only on the South Jeolla Province island of Jindo it was originally distilled for its supposed medicinal qualities. Hongju producers have committed to using only ingredients found on Jindo island.
- Soju, a clear, slightly sweet distilled spirit, is the most popular Korean liquor. It is known as "a friend of life" and "the common people's drink." Soju is made from grains (such as rice, barley, and wheat) or starches, such as potatoes, sweet potatoes, and tapioca. Although soju is often compared to vodka, it has a sweet taste due to added sugar. The drink is usually served in a shot glass. It has a smooth, clean taste, and pairs well with a variety of Korean dishes. Soju is generally inexpensive; a typical bottle costs about ₩1,800, less than US$1.65 (convenience store standards). It typically has an alcohol content of 40 proof (20 percent alcohol by volume).

In the 13th century, during the Goryeo dynasty, Mongol invaders brought soju (known as araki) with them. Araki is derived from the Arabic araq (liquor). Soju was originally developed in Arabia, and passed through Mongolia on its way to Korea. Distilled liquor was new to Koreans, who were accustomed to fermented alcoholic drinks such as makgeolli. Mongol camps such as Kaesong, Andong and Jeju Island are well-known soju-producing regions. During the late 20th century, soju flavored with lemon or green tea became available. The Japanese version is known as shōchū.

Danyangbeop (single-brew) or leeyangbeop (double-brew) are traditional grain-wine brewing methods. Takju or cheongju is distilled to produce soju. Andong soju's distinctive flavor is well known in the city. Okroju from Gyeonggi Province originated in Hanyang during the late Joseon dynasty. Munbae-ju is South Korea's Important Intangible Cultural Property 86‑1. It is a traditional liquor made from malted millet, sorghum, wheat, rice and nuruk, with a strength of 40 percent alcohol by volume. Munbae-ju originated in the Pyongyang region and is known for its fragrance, which is said to resemble the flower of the munbae (pear) tree.

Distilled liquors also include goryangju and okroju.

==== Flavoured ====
Yagyong-jeungryuju (medicinal liquor) include:

- Gamhongno is a traditional light-pink liquor with medicinal herbs which is popular in Pyongyang and the Kwanso region of North Korea. It is distilled three times and aged for 120 years.
- Igang-ju is a straw-colored drink which has been brewed in Jeolla and Hwanghae Provinces since the mid-Joseon dynasty. With a delicate scent, it is flavored with curcuma root, cinnamon, and pears.

=== Fruit wines ===
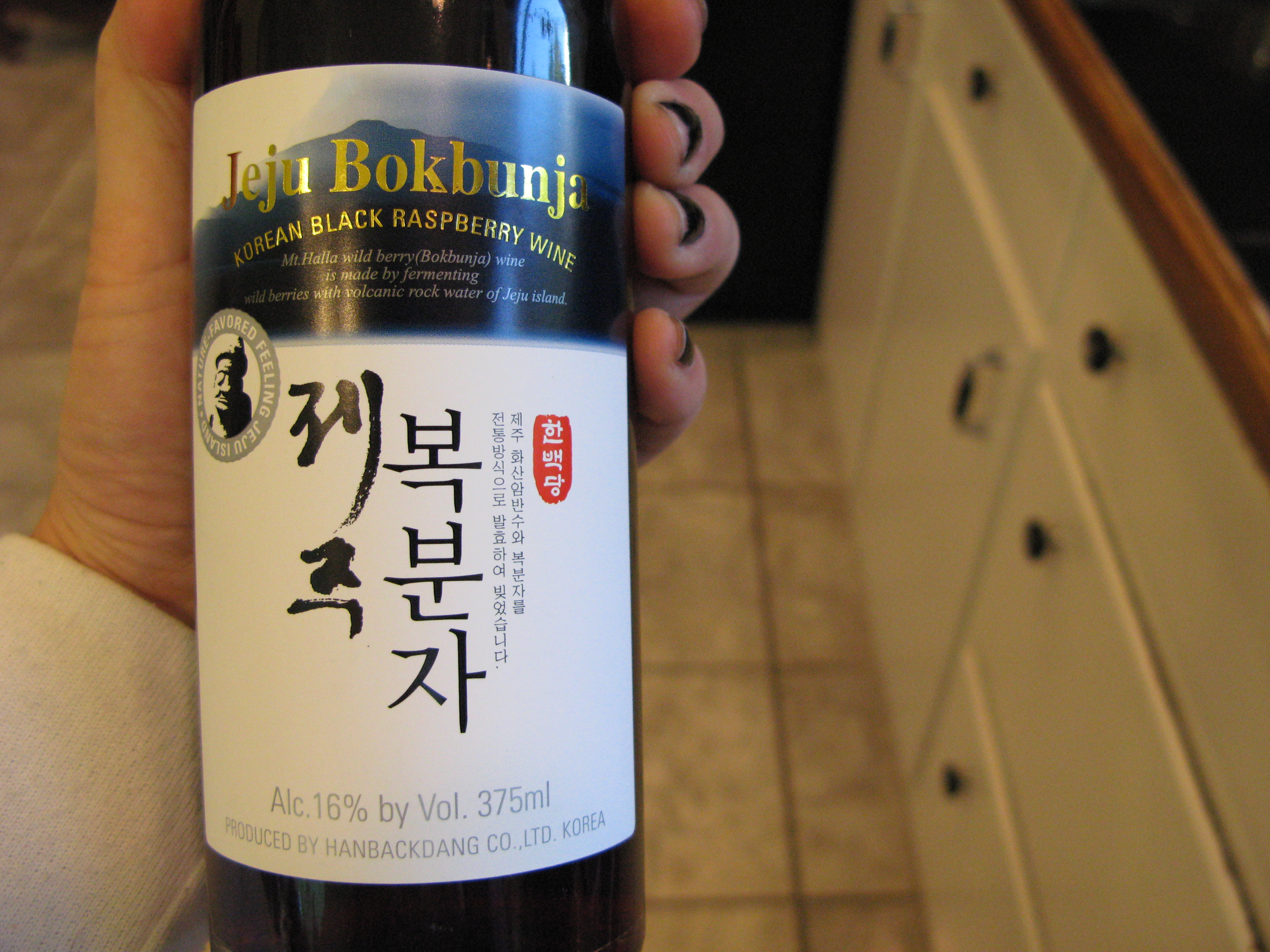
A bottle of bokbunja ju

Korea has a number of traditional fruit wines, produced by combining fruits or berries with alcohol. Podoju (포도주; 葡萄酒) is made from rice wine which is mixed with grapes. The most popular fruit wines include maesil-ju (made from plums), bokbunja-ju (made from Korean black raspberries), and wines made from Chinese quinces, cherries and pomegranates.

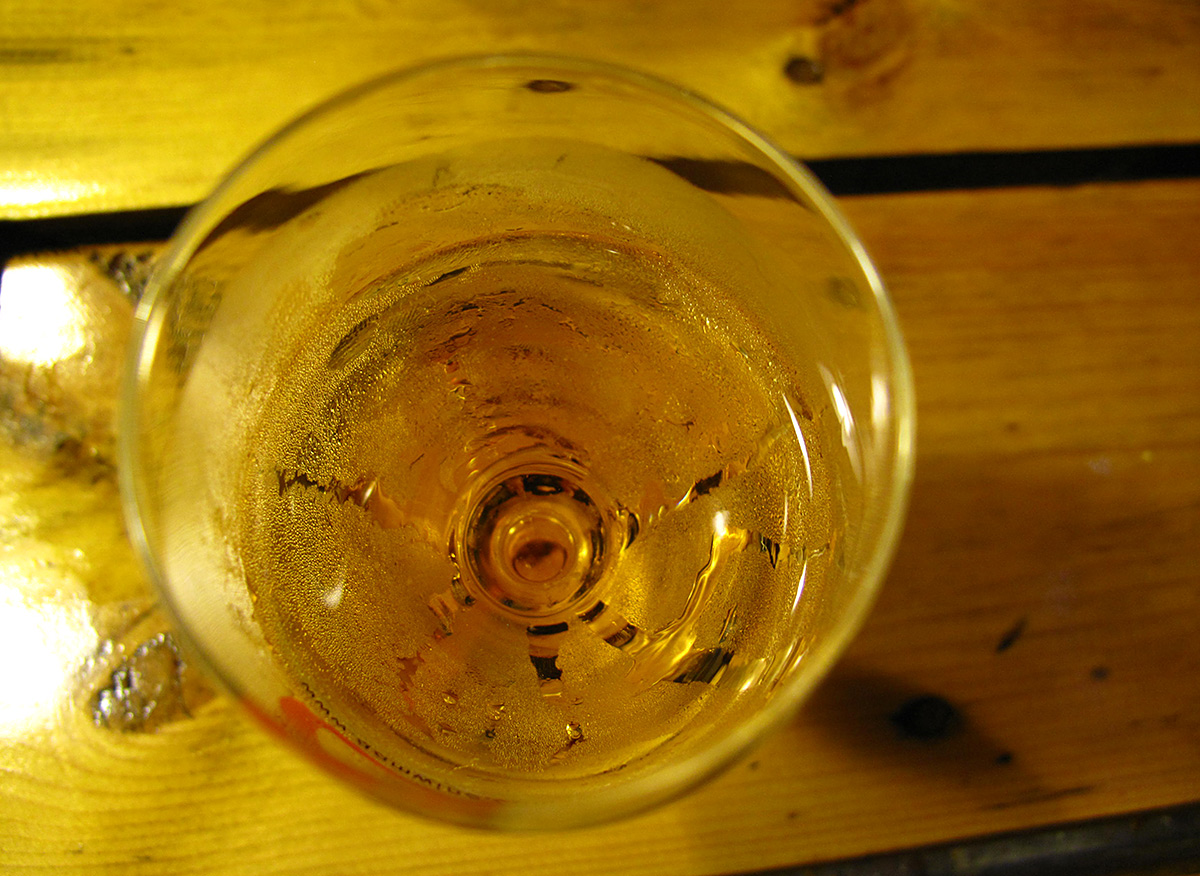
Persimmon wine (감와인) from Daegu

Gwasilju is usually made from fruits or grains. In the spring, people make alcoholic drinks with azaleas, forsythia, peaches, and pears. In the summer, lotuses and roses are often used. In the fall, chrysanthemum, yuzu, Korean wild grapes, black raspberries, and apples are often infused. In the winter, Asian apricot is sometimes used.

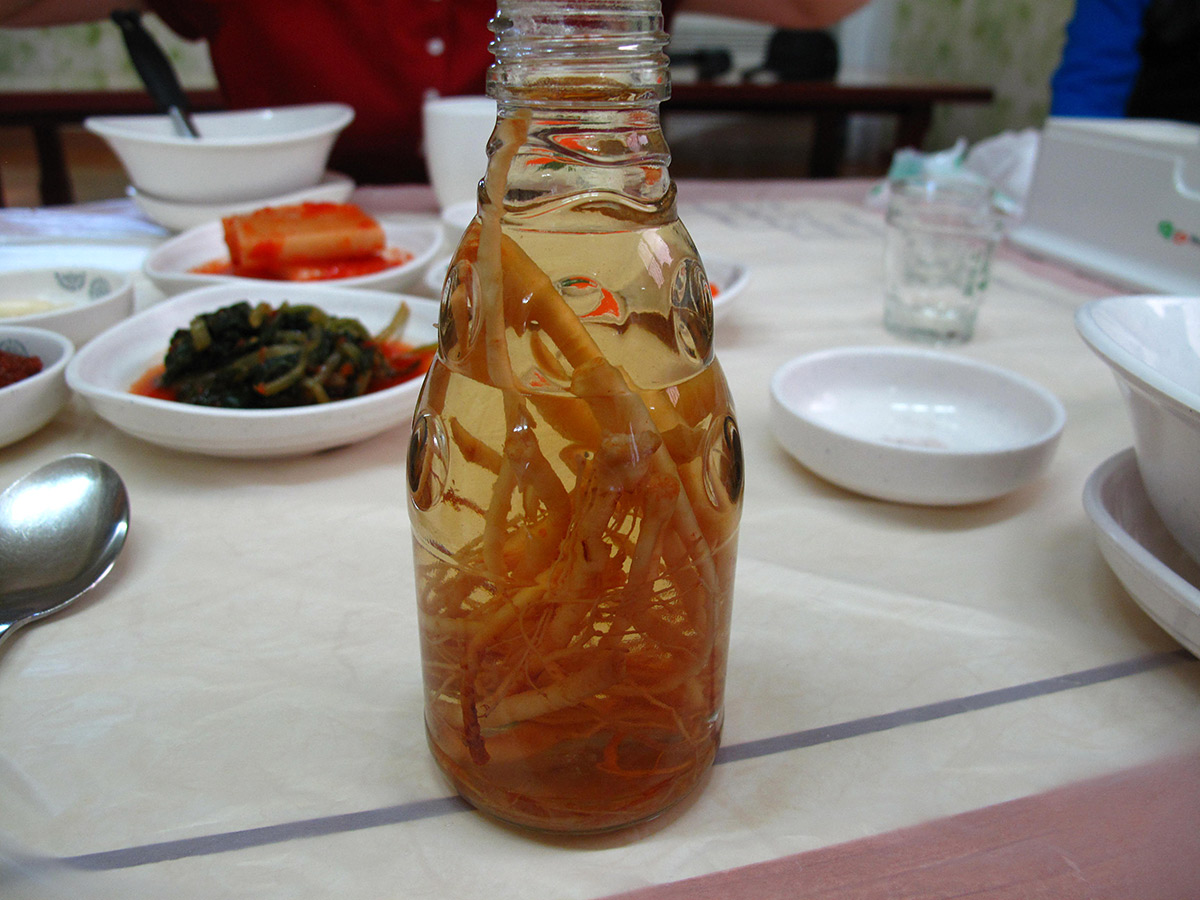
Insamju (ginseng wine)

=== Beer ===
Beer (called maekju; 맥주; 麥酒) was introduced to Korea by Europeans, and there are several breweries in South Korea.

== Regional varieties ==
=== Seoul ===
Seoul Songjeolju is an aromatic liquor brewed with songjeol along with pine tree branches giving it a medical effect. During the Joseon period, this liquor was enjoyed by middle-class Koreans. The pine symbolizes integrity and thus was more popular among scholars. During the reign of King Sunjo(1800–1834) of the Joseon dynasty, Samhaeju was passed on within the Andong Kim family. The liquor was particularly enjoyed by royal families since the Goryeo dynasty. It consists of three mashes made with rice and nuruk within three days on the pig day of the first lunar month. Also known as baegiliju (100-day liquor). A clear wine, Hyangonju is made with rice as a starch. It was exclusively for royal families and made by an agency for royal liquors.

=== Daegu ===
Daegu Hahyangju is made with wormwood, chrysanthemums, and spring water from Mt.Biseulsan. The fermentation process takes 100 days to have a fragrance of the lotus flower. Hahyangju is mentioned in the records of Dongui program which talks about the effects on health, from getting rid of watery eyes, and headaches to relieving fever and stokes.

=== Daejeon ===
Daejeon has Songsunju, which uses pine sprouts during spring to make mash used to serve the guest by scholars.

=== Gyeonggi Province ===
In Gyeonggi Province, alcohol like Guemyeongju, gunpo dangjeong ongnoju, namhansanseong soju are heritage. Gyemyeongju is a sokseongju having a sweet taste and it gets its name which means cock's crow liquor as it can be made overnight. It's a fast-made liquor and hence made when liquor is needed in more quantity suddenly. Gunpo Dangjeong obgnoju is a distilled spirit passed within Yu family in 1880, having a good scent and helping blood circulation. The name ongoju comes from the jade bead-like dewdrops formed during distillation.

=== Namhansangseong ===
Namhansangseong soju is passed from its fortress, which uses traditional taffy leaving a good scent.

=== North Chungcheong Province ===
In the North Chungcheong Province Hansan Sogokju, Gyeryong Baegilju, Asan Yeonnyeopju, geumsan insambaekju, cheongyang gugijaju. Hansan sogokju or sitter's liquor has a history of 1500 years and is one of the oldest Sul of Korea. Gyeryong Baegiliju is made with rice, flour, flowers, and pine needles with other ingredients and fermented for 100days. Asan Yeonnnyeopju meaning lotus leaves liquor made with rice and lotus leaves and fermented once after summer. Geumsan Insambaekju is made with ginseng Geumsan is well known for ginseng production and rice, grain wheat, and wormwood have amber color and scent of ginseng. Cheongyang gugijaju is made with gugija also known as Chinese matrimonial vine and rice gives it a reddish color.

=== North Jeolla Province ===
In North Jeolla Province, there are Igangju and jungnyeokgo sul. Igangju is representative liquor of the province, starting from the Joseon period. Ginger and pear are added to soju. Jungyeokgois is a medical liquor made with bamboo shoots juice and ginger extract added to soju from the mid-Joseon period.

=== South Jeolla Province ===
In South Jeolla Province, Haenam Jinnyangju is a royal liquor passed down from court lady, jindo hongju has its origin in the Goryeo dynasty it has a scarlet color that promotes appetite and digestion with a medicinal effect. Boseong ganghaju is made with rice wine and added to barley distilled liquor, was well known for its excellent flavor. Initially consumed by nobles and even at some point served to the king but later on, it spread to the people of ganghaju.

=== Gyeongsangbuk Province ===
In North Gyeongsang Province, Gimcheon gwahaju has a long history of existence and is a representative liquor of Gimchon made with rice, nuruk, and water from GwahCheon stream. Andong soju passes from Andong's famous household. Made from Mt. Mokseongsan water, it obtained unique flavor and medicinal properties. Mungyeong Hosanchun is also known to have its unique taste in the water from Daeha village. It has a higher viscosity and flowery scent. Andong Songhwaju has a history of 200 years passed down from the Jeonju Yu family and used as a ritual table for ancestors with a flowery scent.

=== North Gyeongsang Province ===
In South Gyeongsang Province, Hamyang Songsunju was made for medical use with rice, nuruk with pine tree sprouts in spring having a long history of existence as recorded in documents from the Goryeo dynasty. These days pine needles are used instead of pine sprouts when off-season.

=== Jeju Province ===
Omegisul is made with millet starch instead of rice. Takju made with millet is omegisul. Gosorisul is produced after distillation of omegisul.

== Artifacts ==
=== Juryeonggu ===
The Juryeonggu is a wooden die from unified Silla (668–935), which was invented for a noble drinking party. It is a 14-sided die of about 5 cm in diameter. Unlike modern dice which have numbers or dots, this had penalties like dancing without music, drinking alcohol and laughing loudly, drinking several cups of liquor in one go, singing, hitting the nose, and so on.

=== Gyeyeongbae ===
Gyeyeongbae means a warning that the glass is full. The function of this cup was to empty itself when it was full. They originated from ritual vessels for worship.

=== Masangbae ===
These are cups used on horseback, these were special cups used by soldiers on a horseback during battles and used for feasts and rituals when there was no war. Their period of usage can be identified from the material used and its shape. For example, during the Goryeo dynasty they were of earthenware with handles, but in the later period made of porcelain and also wooden with patterns.

== In art ==
Composer Jeong Cheol's Jangjinju depicts Scholars' and poets' love for alcohol. Works like “In a tavern” by poet Kim Byeong-Yeon(1807–1863), records by literally official Lee Hyeon-bo(1467–1555), “Jiang gimado” painting title by Kim Hong-do(1745-) also known as chwihwasa-a drunken painter, Kim Myeon-guk known for “Dalmado” was nicknamed chwiong-a drunken elder, Jang Seoun-eop (1843–1897) from Joseon dynasty was known as chwihwaseon-a drunken deity, all these showcases that how alcohol was an integral cultural aspect for Koreans from ancient time and was well enjoyed and loved by Kings, nobles, scholars, artists, officials and sparked inspiration and influenced their work.

The paintings from ancient times depicted people drinking in various scenarios, festival scenes, and different occasions like scholars enjoying Sul in leisure, and commoners in a humor-filled scenario. Paintings like Jusageobae (Holding a Drinking Party; Collection of the Gansong Art Museum) by Sin Yun-bok, Jumak (Tavern; Collection of the National Museum of Korea) by Kim Hong-do gave a clear depiction of mannerism, social class division, and fun activities while drinking, locations of consumption like in nature among mountains or in a hustling bustling environment in Jumak, pub, banquet or during events like martial competition or seasonal ceremony.

== Intangible Cultural Heritage ==
Sul is an Intangible Cultural Heritage at both city and provincial levels. After Japanese colonization, the drastic decline and extinction of traditional Korean alcoholic beverages called for a strong measure to preserve the culture, skills and alcohols. One of the major steps taken was to declare sul to be an intangible cultural heritage, establishment of museums, organizing themed tour.

== See also ==
- Drinking culture of Korea
- List of rice drinks
