= Bohae =

Bohae (Korean: 보해양조주식회사, BOHAE BREWERY CO., LTD.) is a South Korean brewing company based in Mokpo, South Jeolla Province, representing breweries company within Honam region. Among other beverages, Bonae produces soju (a drink extracted from maple) and lemon cap, a wine made from Rubus coreanus.

In the 1950s, Lim Gwang Haeng (임광행) established the company, whose background started from Japanese businessman, gaining the permission from national government. To start the enterprise, farmlands of Prunus mume were enormously planted in Haenam county. The company got awarded the exports of 5 million dollars by sending its wine made from Rubus coreanus for United States, Japan and Australia.

In 2004, firstly as a South Korean brewing company, it gained entry for American wine market with a nickname of rugby ball-shaped bottle. The wine brand (보해복분자주, Bohae wine distilled from Korean black raspberries) also grabbed the title of silver and bronze in world wine competition. In 2005, Bohae wine became official wine of APEC summit initiated in Busan.

== Products ==
=== Fruit Wine ===
- Bohae Bokbunjajoo (Bokbunja-ju)
- Matchsoon (Maesil-ju)

=== Soju ===
- Yipseju
- Bohae Soju

=== Makgeolli ===
- Soony
