= Gwaha-ju =

Traditional Korean fortified rice wine

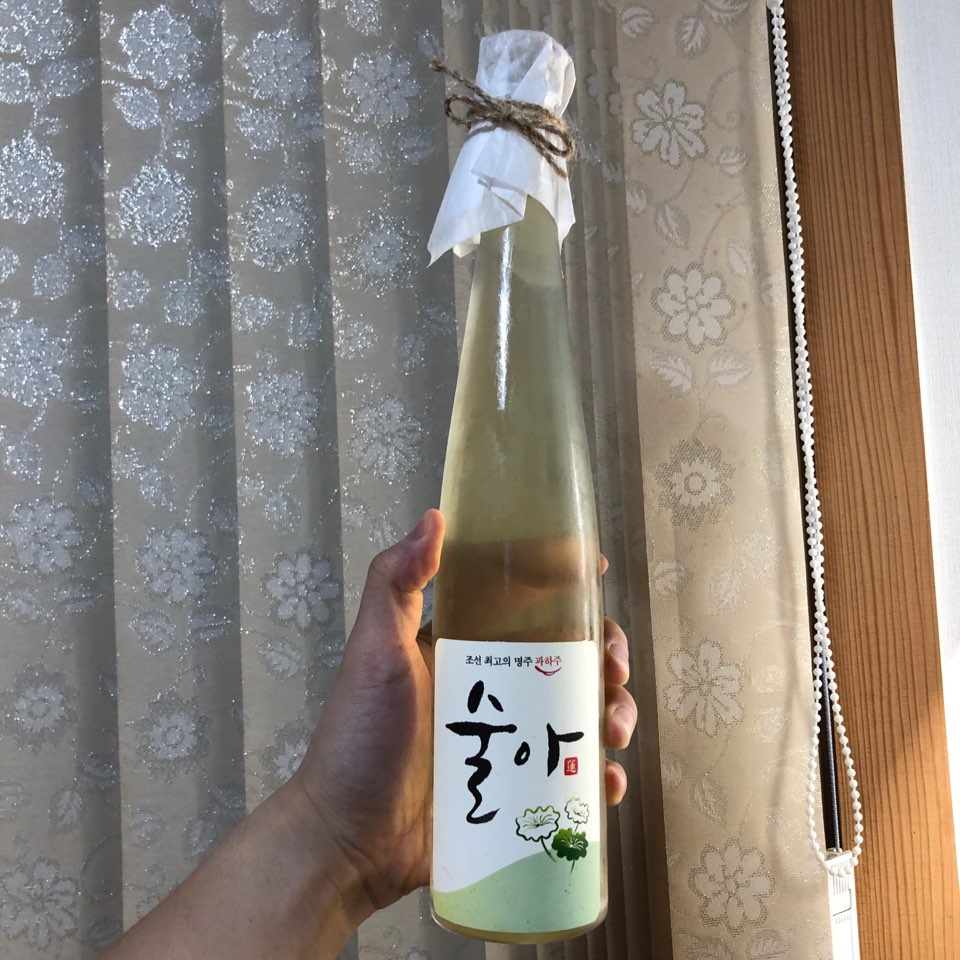
- Type: Fortified rice wine
- Origin: Korea, Boseong, South Jeolla; Namwon, North Jeolla; Suwon, Gyeonggi; Yeonggwang, South Jeolla
- Related products: cheongju, soju

Korean name
- Hangul: 과하주
- Hanja: 過夏酒
- Lit.: summer-passing wine
- RR: gwahaju
- MR: kwahaju
- IPA: [kwa.ɦa.dʑu]

Name in Boseong, Yeonggwang
- Hangul: 강하주
- Hanja: 薑荷酒
- RR: ganghaju
- MR: kanghaju
- IPA: [kaŋ.ɦa.dʑu]

Name in Namwon
- Hangul: 신선주
- Hanja: 神仙酒
- RR: sinseonju
- MR: sinsŏnju
- IPA: [ɕin.sʌn.dʑu]

Name in Suwon
- Hangul: 약소주
- Hanja: 藥燒酒
- RR: yaksoju
- MR: yaksoju
- IPA: [jak̚.s͈o.dʑu]

Gwaha-ju (Korean: 과하주; Hanja: 過夏酒; lit. 'summer-passing wine') is a traditional Korean fortified rice wine. The refined rice wine cheongju (also called yakju) is fortified by adding the distilled spirit soju to produce gwaha-ju. Popular varieties include gangha-ju (강하주) of Boseong and Yeonggwang in South Jeolla Province, sinseon-ju (신선주) of Namwon in North Jeolla Province, and yak-soju (약소주) of Suwon in Gyeonggi Province.

== Name ==
The word gwaha-ju (과하주; 過夏酒) consists of three syllables: gwa (과; 過) meaning "to pass" or "to last", ha (하; 夏) meaning "summer", and ju (주; 酒) meaning "alcoholic beverage". The name suggests that the rice wine retains its flavor after the hot and humid summer, due to the fortification (addition of soju).

Regional varieties of gwaha-ju are called by their own regional names such as gangha-ju (강하주; 薑荷酒), sinseon-ju (신선주; 神仙酒; lit. '"(Taoist) Immortal's wine"'), and yak-soju (약소주; 藥燒酒; lit. '"yakju soju'"').

Other names mentioned in old documents include gwaha-baekju (과하백주; 過夏白酒; lit. '"pass-summer white wine"') in Sanga Yorok, a mid-15th century cookbook, and ohyang-soju (오향소주; 五香燒酒; lit. '"five flavour distilled liquor"') in Imwon gyeongjeji, an 1827 encyclopedic compilation. The drink normally has about 13 to 15 percent alcohol, though some commercial examples are sold at 16 percent and 23 percent ABV.

== History ==
Gwaha-baekju was first mentioned in Sanga Yorok, a mid-15th century cookbook, but the rice wine was made without fortification. The earliest recorded recipe for fortified gangha-ju appears in Ŭmsik timibang, a 1670 cookbook. Other Joseon books that mention the fortified rice wine include Jubangmun, Chisaeng yoram, Yeokjubangmun, Eumsikbo, Sallim kyŏngje, Chŭngbo sallim kyŏngje, Kyuhap ch'ongsŏ, and Imwon gyeongjeji.

Gwaha-ju is traditionally described as a summer-preserving liquor with a light brown color that is sweet-smelling.The soju is added during fermentation to fortify the fermented beverage and help the drink retain its taste and quality through hot weather.The method that is comparative to fortified wines such as port and sherry, in which distilled liquor is added during or after fermentation. The fortified rice wine was a luxurious prestige drink made in the wealthy households of yangban gentries in the early 15th century, but gradually spread and became popular among commonality.

Many legacy gwaha-ju recipes disappeared due to the harsh periods of Japanese forced occupation (1910–1945) and the Korean War (1950–1953). Today, only a few regional varieties such as gangha-ju (강하주; 薑荷酒) of Boseong and Yeonggwang in South Jeolla Province, sinseon-ju (신선주; 神仙酒) of Namwon in North Jeolla Province, and yak-soju (약소주; 藥燒酒) of Suwon in Gyeonggi Province, survive, with the recipes being transmitted within families.

== Varieties and brewing ==
A recipe for gwaha-ju in the 17th century cookbook Ŭmsik timibang states:

A bottle of boiled and cooled water is added to nuruk (fermentation starter) powder and set aside overnight, strained with additional sterile water. A mal (18 L, 4.0 imp gal, 4.8 US gal) of glutinous rice is steamed, cooled, and mixed with the nuruk-solution. After 3 days of primary fermentation, 20 bokja (9–10 L, 2.0–2.2 imp gal, 2.4–2.6 US gal) of soju (distilled liquor) is added to the rice wine. The fortified rice wine is consumed after 7 days of secondary fermentation.

A recipe for gwaha-ju in the 1809 encyclopaedia Kyuhap ch'ongsŏ states:

1–2 doe (1.8–3.6 L, 0.40–0.79 imp gal, 0.48–0.95 US gal) of white non-glutinous rice is cooked into beombeok (thick porridge), cooled, and mixed with nuruk powder. A mal (18 L, 4.0 imp gal, 4.8 US gal) of glutinous rice is steamed, cooled, and mixed with the nuruk mixture. After 7 days of primary fermentation, 20 bokja (9–10 L, 2.0–2.2 imp gal, 2.4–2.6 US gal) of soju (distilled liquor) is added to the rice wine.

Today, family recipes passed down through generations usually utilize various medicinal herbs as supplementary ingredients.Modern descriptions of production similarly note that soju is added to fermented liquor, followed by further fermentation and aging. A recipe in the 1827 document Imwon gyeongjeji states that ohyang-soju (five flavour distilled liquor) is made by: "brewing rice wine with cooked glutinous rice and nuruk (fermentation starter); adding powdered herbs such as sandalwood, costus, snowparsley, and clove, as well as whole walnuts and jujubes and soju (distilled liquor) after the primary fermentation; sealing hermetically for the secondary fermentation; opening the wine jar after 7 days and sealing again; and letting age for 29 days."

Recent reporting has also identified Gimcheon in North Gyeongsang Province as a present-day production area.

Gwaha-ju has also appeared in modern commercial and cultural contexts. Some product lines include multiple gwaha-ju variants, and one such example was served during a 2017 state visit to Korea.

=== Boseong gangha-ju ===
Boseong gangha-ju is the fortified rice wine brewed in Do Hwa-ja's house in Boseong County, South Jeolla Province. The family recipe uses jujubes, ginger, and gotgam (dried persimmon).

=== Namwon sinseon-ju ===
Namwon sinseon-ju is the fortified rice wine brewed in Gim Gil-im's house in Namwon, South Jeolla Province. The family recipe uses pine needles, mung beans, chestnuts, ginseng, dried poria, and bamboo leaves.

=== Suwon yak-soju ===
Suwon yak-soju is the fortified rice wine brewed in Gim Myeong-ja's house in Suwon, Gyeonggi Province. The family recipe uses longan, dried ginseng, steamed jujubes, ginger juice, and cinnamon.

=== Yeonggwang gangha-ju ===
Yeonggwang gangha-ju is the fortified rice wine brewed in Jo Hui-ja's house in Yeonggwang County, South Jeolla Province. The family recipe uses roasted goji berries, steamed jujubes, ganghwal, longan, and ginger juice.

== See also ==
- Fortified wine
- List of Korean beverages
