= Munbae-ju =

Korean distilled liquor

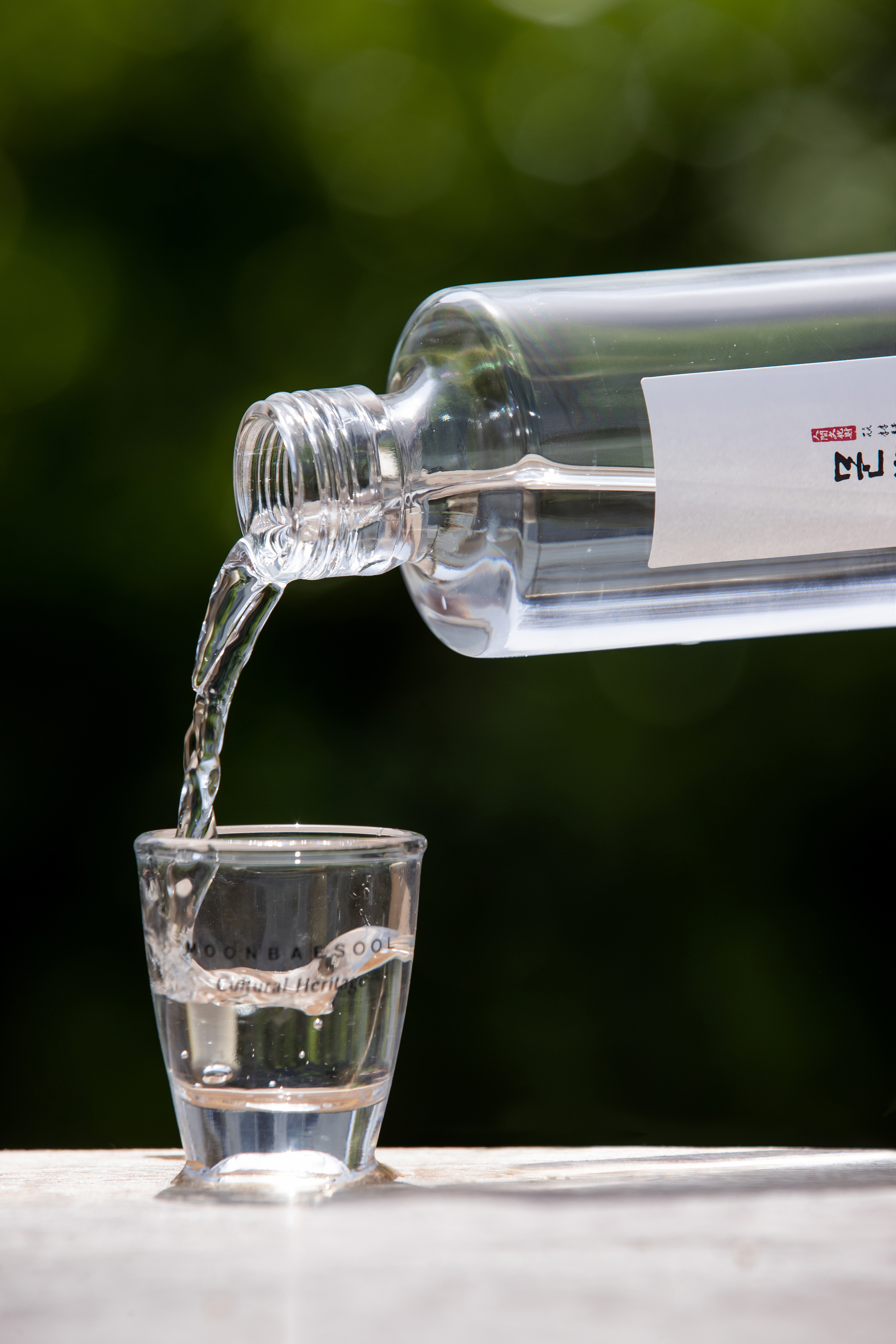

Korean name
- Hangul: 문배주
- Hanja: 문배酒
- RR: munbaeju
- MR: munbaeju

Munbae-ju (Korean: 문배주; lit. Pyrus ussuriensis var. seoulensis alcohol) is a Korean traditional distilled liquor that is considered one of the finest Korean spirits. This name is derived from its fruity scent from the wild pear, though no pear is used in its production.

== Ingredients and production ==
Munbaeju is brewed from wheat, hulled millet, Indian millet, and nuruk (fermentation starter), then distilled.

== Origins ==
Although it is South Korea's "Important Intangible Cultural Property Number 86-1", it originated from North Korea's Pyongyang. Its origins are traced to the Goryeo period. The water used to produce Munbaeju comes from the Taedong River. A royal subject of Wang Geon presented him with home-brewed munbaeju, which his family had made with a secret recipe for generations. Wang Geon was so impressed with its taste, that he gave the subject a high-ranking position in the government. Ever since this event, Munbaeju was a wine drunk by kings, and is commonly served to important foreign dignitaries during welcoming receptions.

== See also ==
- Korean wine
- Korean culture
- Important Intangible Cultural Properties of Korea
