= Cheongju (drink) =

Korean refined rice wine

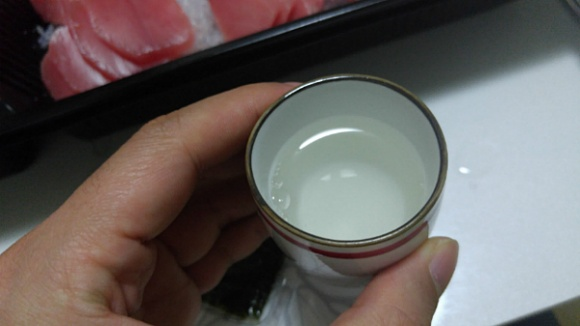
- Type: Rice wine
- Origin: Korea, East Asia
- Alcohol by volume: 14%
- Proof (US): 28
- Variants: Beopju, sogok-ju
- Related products: Mijiu, huangjiu, sake

Korean name
- Hangul: 청주
- Hanja: 淸酒
- Lit.: clear wine
- RR: cheongju
- MR: ch'ŏngju
- IPA: tɕʰʌŋ.dʑu

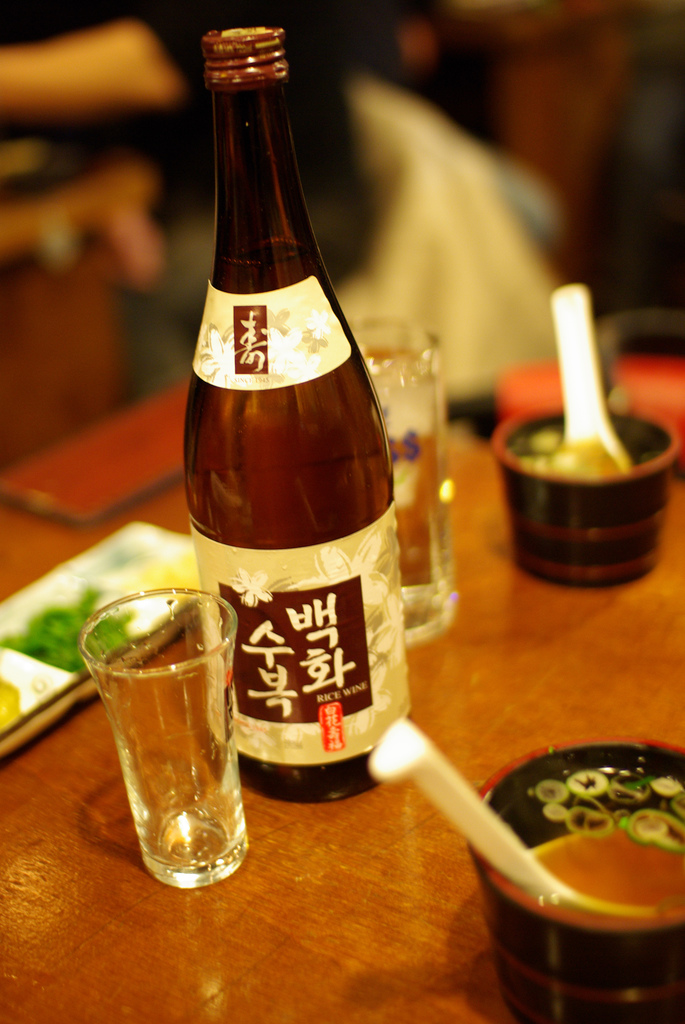
Baekhwasubok (백화수복), a branded cheongju

Cheongju (Korean: 청주; Hanja: 淸酒; lit. clear wine), sometimes romanized as Chungju, is a clear, refined rice wine of Korean origin.

== Names ==
The word cheongju (청주; 淸酒) consists of two characters: cheong (청; 淸) meaning "clear" and ju (주; 酒) meaning "alcoholic drink". It contrasts with takju (탁주; 濁酒), as "tak" (탁; 濁) means "turbid". The word takju usually refers to makgeolli (milky, unrefined rice wine). The hanja characters 淸酒 are the same as the kanji pronounced seishu used on the labels of sake.

The native Korean word for "clear wine", malgeun-sul (맑은술), is also used to refer to cheongju. Another name for cheongju is yakju (약주; 藥酒), which literally translates into "medicinal wine".

== History ==
According to Things on Korea—a 12th-century book on Korea written by Song Chinese scholar Sun Mu (孫穆)—the Goryeo people used non-glutinous rice to brew rice wine. Another 12th-century Chinese book, Illustrated Account of Goryeo, reports that Korean rice wine that is made with nuruk is deeper in color and has a higher alcohol content; it says that when drinking this wine one gets drunk quickly and sobers up quickly. This book says that clear, refined rice wine was made in the royal court, while milky, unrefined rice wine was more popular among commoners.

== Preparation ==
Cheongju is usually brewed in winter, between the months of November and March. Steamed rice mixed with nuruk (fermentation starter) and water is left to ferment for 16 to 25 days, at a temperature not higher than 14–16 °C (57–61 °F). During the fermentation process, the rice starch becomes saccharified; the yeast fungi feed on the sugars created by saccharification and produce alcohol. The fermented wine is then filtered with yongsu (a wine strainer), which is dipped into the liquid. The clear wine inside the yongsu is ladled out to make cheongju.

== Consumption ==
Cheongju has been widely used in a variety of traditional rituals and rites, as it is regarded as a well-prepared alcohol.

== Varieties ==
Southern cities in South Korea such as Masan, Gunsan, and Nonsan are famous for producing good cheongju. Beopju brewed in Gyeongju and sogok-ju brewed in Hansan are well-known varieties of cheongju. There also are cheongju varieties made with glutinous rice or black rice.

Flavoured cheongju varieties include gukhwa-ju made with chrysanthemum, dugyeon-ju made with rhododendron, songsun-ju made with pine sprouts, yeonyeop-ju made with lotus leaves, and insam-ju made with ginseng.

== Similar beverages ==
Cheongju is similar to other East Asian rice wine counterparts such as the Chinese mijiu and Japanese sake. A dry white vermouth can also serve as a substitute for cheongju in cooking.

== Gallery ==
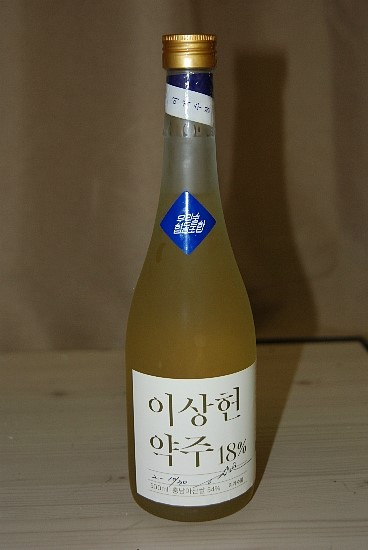
Yi Sangheon yakju

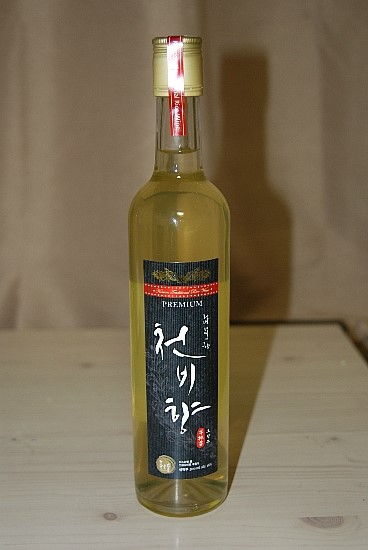
Cheonbihyang

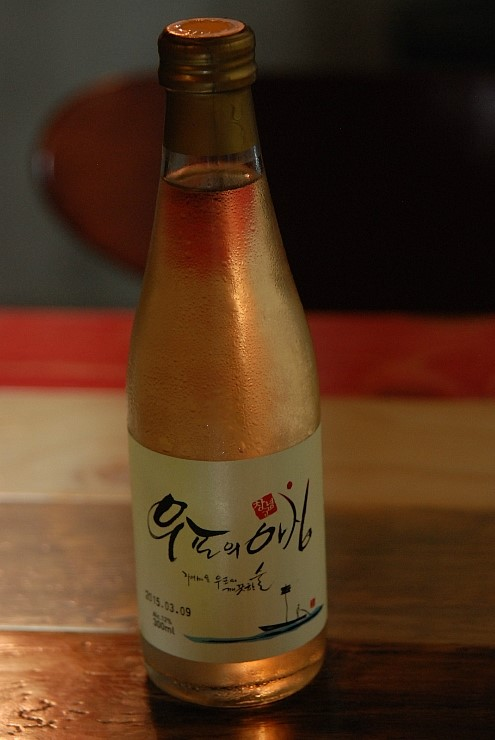
Upoui achim

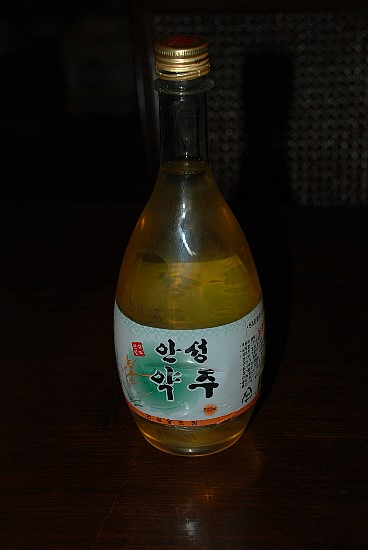
Anseong yakju

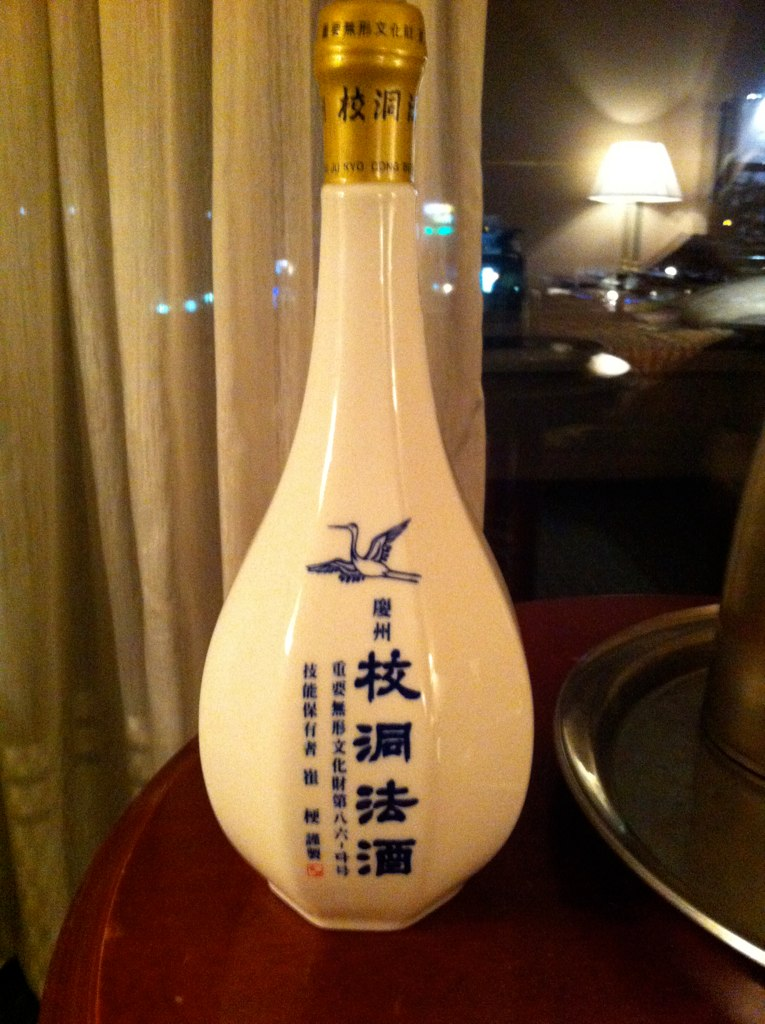
Beopju

== See also ==
- Gwaha-ju, fortified rice wine
- Korean alcoholic beverages
- Mijiu, a Chinese equivalent of cheongju
- Sake, a Japanese equivalent of cheongju
