= Bokbunja-ju =

Korean black raspberry wine

Bokbunjajoo
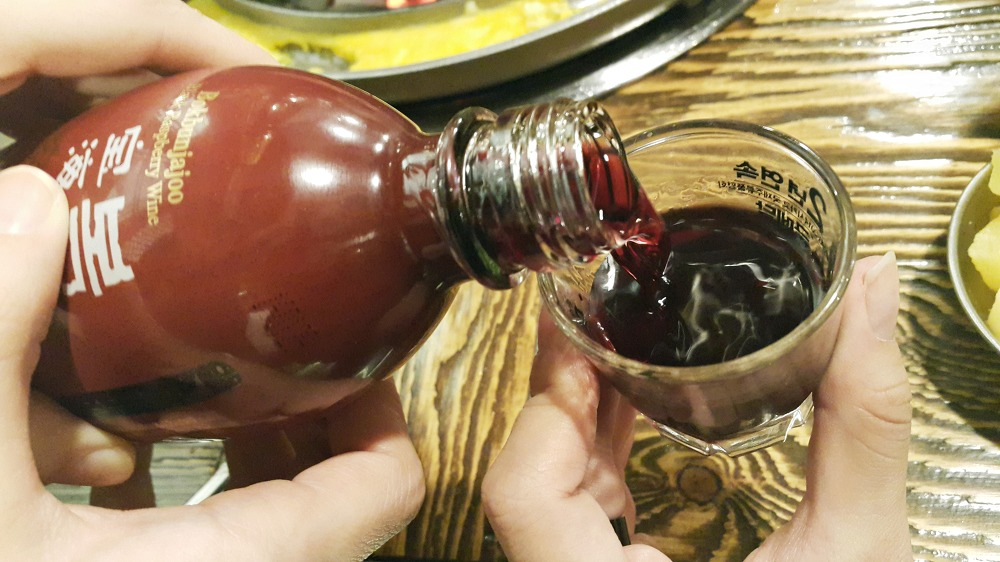
- Type: Fruit wine
- Origin: Korea
- Ingredients: black raspberries

Korean name
- Hangul: 복분자주
- Hanja: 覆盆子酒
- RR: bokbunjaju
- MR: pokpunjaju
- IPA: pok̚.p͈un.dʑa.dʑu

Bokbunja-ju (Korean: 복분자주; Hanja: 覆盆子酒), also called bokbunja wine, is a Korean fruit wine made from wild and cultivated black raspberry, traditionally of the Korean species Bokbunja (Rubus coreanus).

The beverage is produced in Gochang County, North Jeolla Province, in Damyang, South Jeolla Province, and in Jeju Province, South Korea. It is made by fermenting berries with water. Some varieties also contain rice and reishi mushroom extract.

Bohae Bokbunjajoo of Bohae Brewery Co., Ltd. is the most well-known bokbunja liquor.

== Description ==
The wine is deep red in color and moderately sweet. The scent of ripe fruit rises, and the sour taste is low. The bitter taste left behind makes it go well with food. Soft tannins irritate the tongue. It ranges between 15% and 19% alcohol by volume, depending on the brand. It is believed to be healthful and to promote male sexual stamina.

Since 2008, South Korean scientists have searched for ways to use bokbunja seeds, which are a by-product of bokbunja-ju production. The carbonized seeds can be used as potential adsorbent for industrial dye removal from wastewaters.
