= Makgeolli =

Korean raw rice wine

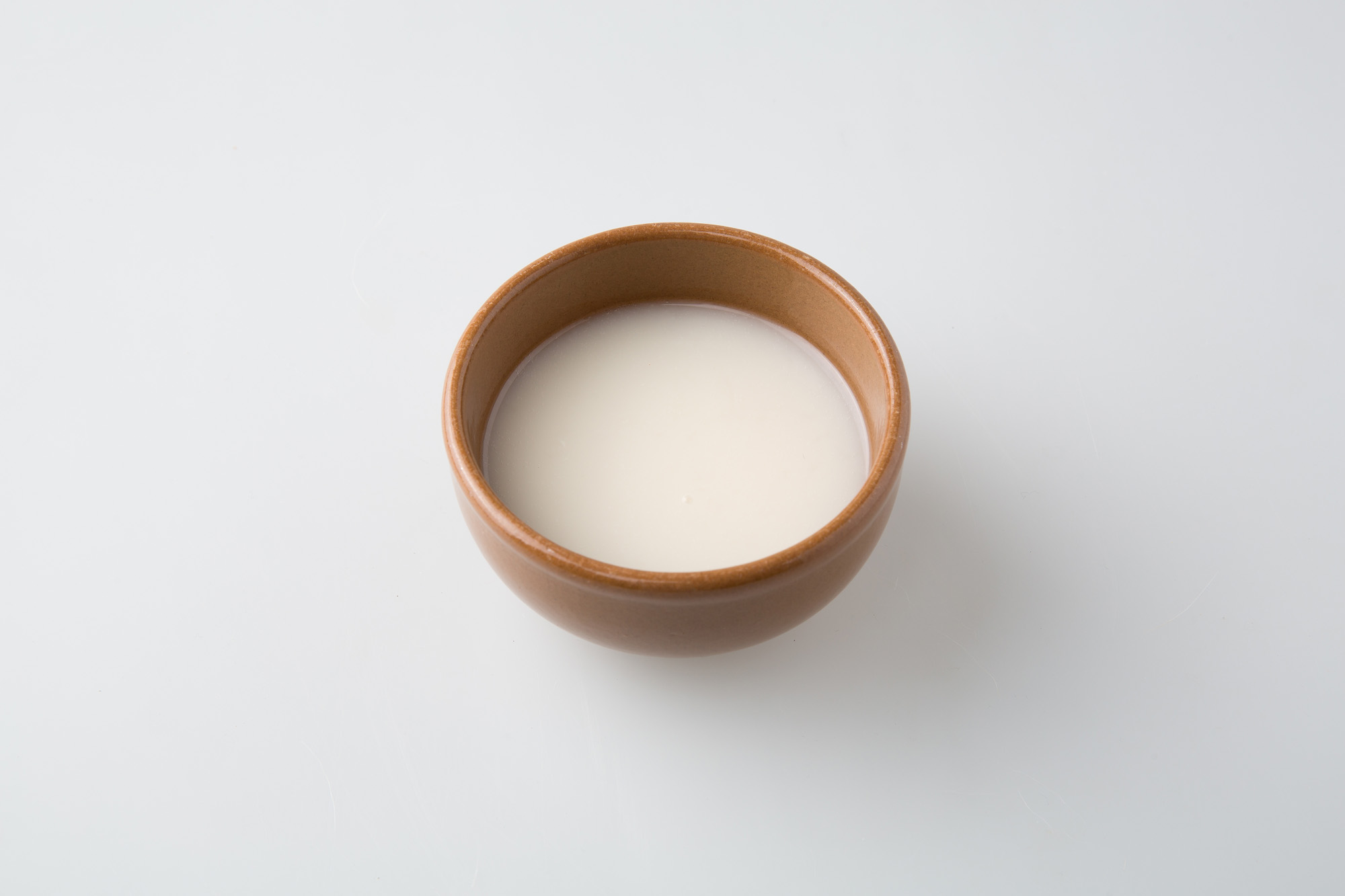
- A bowl of makgeolli
- Type: Rice wine
- Manufacturer: Korea
- Origin: Korea, East Asia
- Introduced: 1 BC
- Alcohol by volume: 6–9%
- Color: Milky, off-white
- Flavor: Ricey
- Ingredients: Rice, nuruk
- Related products: Cheongju, nigori, choujiu, zutho

Korean name
- Hangul: 막걸리
- Lit.: raw rice wine
- RR: makgeolli
- MR: makkŏlli
- IPA: [mak.k͈ʌl.li]

Alternate name
- Hangul: 탁주
- Hanja: 濁酒
- Lit.: opaque wine
- RR: takju
- MR: t'akchu
- IPA: [tʰak̚.t͈ɕu]

Alternate name
- Hangul: 농주
- Hanja: 農酒
- Lit.: farmer's wine
- RR: nongju
- MR: nongju
- IPA: [noŋ.dʑu]

Makgeolli (Korean: 막걸리; pronounced [mak.k͈ʌɭɭi]; lit. 'raw rice wine'), sometimes anglicized to makkoli (/ˈmækəli/, MAK-ə-lee), is a Korean alcoholic drink. It is a milky, off-white, and lightly sparkling rice wine that has a slight viscosity, and tastes slightly sweet, tangy, bitter, and astringent. Chalky sediment gives it a cloudy appearance. As a low proof drink of six to nine percent alcohol by volume, it is often considered a "communal beverage" rather than hard liquor.

In Korea, makgeolli is often unpasteurized, and the wine continues to mature in the bottle. Because of the short shelf life of unpasteurized "draft" makgeolli, many exported makgeolli undergo pasteurization, which deprives the beverage of complex enzymes and flavor compounds. Recently, various fruits such as strawberries and bananas have been added to makgeolli to create forms with new flavours.

== Names ==
The name makgeolli (막걸리) is a compound, consisting of mak (막; in this context "just now") and a deverbal noun derived from the verb stem georeu- (거르-; "to strain, to sift, to filter") to which is added a noun-forming suffix -i (-이).

Because of its cloudy appearance, makgeolli is also called takju (탁주; 濁酒), meaning "opaque wine", as opposed to the refined, transparent cheongju (청주; 淸酒; lit. 'clear wine'). Another name for makgeolli is nongju (농주; 農酒; lit. 'agricultural wine; farmer's wine'), reflecting the traditional popularity of the beverage among farmers.

=== English nickname ===
In 2010, the South Korean Ministry for Food, Agriculture, Forestry, and Fisheries announced "drunken rice" as the winning entry in a competition to find an English nickname for makgeolli. Koju, Kori, Soolsool, McKorea, Rainydaywine, Makcohol and Makelixir were other contenders. The five-member panel reasoned that the chosen name would communicate the product's identity as a rice liquor and evoke associations with its ambassadors, the popular Korean hip-hop group Drunken Tiger. This met with a cool reception from the Korean public, with objections relating to translation of the noun makgeolli, felt to be unnecessary, and to the negative connotations of the word "drunken".

Scottish band Colonel Mustard & The Dijon 5, playing at the inaugural DMZ Peace Train Festival in 2018, called makgeolli 'Fight Milk', or 'Korean Buckfast'.

=== Japanese name ===
In 2009, Korean importers in Japan began producing makgeolli products, promoting them with the name makkori, the Japanese pronunciation of makgeolli. In 2011, several Japanese sake companies, including Gekkeikan and Tatenokawa, launched cloudy rice wines under the name makkori, and announced plans to export the products to Asia, America, and Europe. Concerns were raised in Korea that this could lead to makgeolli being mistakenly regarded as traditionally Japanese rather than Korean, as had happened in the 1996 kimchi-kimuchi case.

== History ==
Makgeolli is the oldest alcoholic beverage in Korea. Rice wine has been brewed since the Three Kingdoms era, which ran from the 1st century BCE to the 7th century CE. The consumption of rice wine during the reign of King Dongmyeong (37–19 BCE) is mentioned in the founding story of the kingdom of Goguryeo in Jewang ungi (Songs of Emperors and Kings), a 13th-century Goryeo Korean book.

There are a number of other early records mentioning rice wine in the Korean Peninsula. The Goryeo Korean book Samguk yusa (Memorabilia of the Three Kingdoms) mentions the brewing of yorye (醪醴, "cloudy rice wine") in the kingdom of Silla for King Suro of Gaya by his seventeenth-generation descendant in 661, in its section entitled Garakguk gi (Record of the State of Garak). In the Jin Chinese book Sānguózhì (Records of the Three Kingdoms), the section Dongyi (Eastern Foreigners) of the Wei Shu (Book of Wei) contains the observation that "the Goguryeo Koreans are skilled in making fermented foods such as wine, soybean paste, and salted and fermented fish". The Asuka Japanese book Kojiki (Records of Ancient Matters) makes reference in the section entitled Ōjin-tennō (Emperor Ōjin) to a man named Inbeon (仁番) from the kingdom of Baekje being taught how to brew wine. And the poem Gōngzishí (公子時), by the Tang Chinese poet Li Shangyin, refers to Silla wine (新羅酒) made with non-glutinous rice.

During the Goryeo dynasty, makgeolli was called ihwa-ju (이화주; 梨花酒, pear blossom alcohol), as the liquor was made when the pear trees were in blossom. This was associated in many communities in Korea around that time with a tradition of all-night drinking and dancing in special ceremonies. Makgeolli was brewed at home for centuries and was considered a "farmer's wine", or rural working-class beverage.

During the period of Japanese rule of Korea (1910–1945), the colonial government introduced a licensing system and taxed even for self-consumption, and by 1934, home brewing had been banned. The Park Chung Hee dictatorship also banned its making (1965) because of rice shortages. In 1990, the South Korean ban on brewing with rice was finally lifted, with home brewing again becoming legal only at the beginning of the 21st century. In the interim period, makgeolli was made from wheat.

The most-consumed alcoholic drink in South Korea in the 1960s and 1970s, makgeolli began to lose popularity in the 1970s with the rise of imported alcoholic beverages. Also, due to the national food shortage, the government banned making makgeolli using rice, and makgeolli was made by mixing 80% wheat flour and 20% corn. When flour was used, the quality of makgeolli deteriorated. As makgeolli was considered cheap and old-fashioned, sellers then focused on selling quantity rather than quality, with many makgeolli companies turning to mass production. In this process, the rice wine is usually brewed with a non-traditionally manufactured fermentation starter instead of the traditional nuruk. It is also diluted with water.

In the 21st century, makgeolli enjoyed a resurgence in urban areas and among younger generations. The health benefits and low alcohol proof of makgeolli, and a growing interest in cultural traditions in recent decades, have contributed to the revival. The product continues to be inexpensive, with a plastic, soft drink-style 750 ml (26 imp fl oz; 25 US fl oz) bottle costing around ₩1,200 ($1.05). Novelty high-end makgeolli are also produced, using traditional methods free of artificial additives. There were at least 700 small-scale breweries in production in South Korea in 2017. As of 2023, Geumjeongsanseong Makgeolli in Busan was the only officially recognized makgeolli master in the country.

== Brewing ==
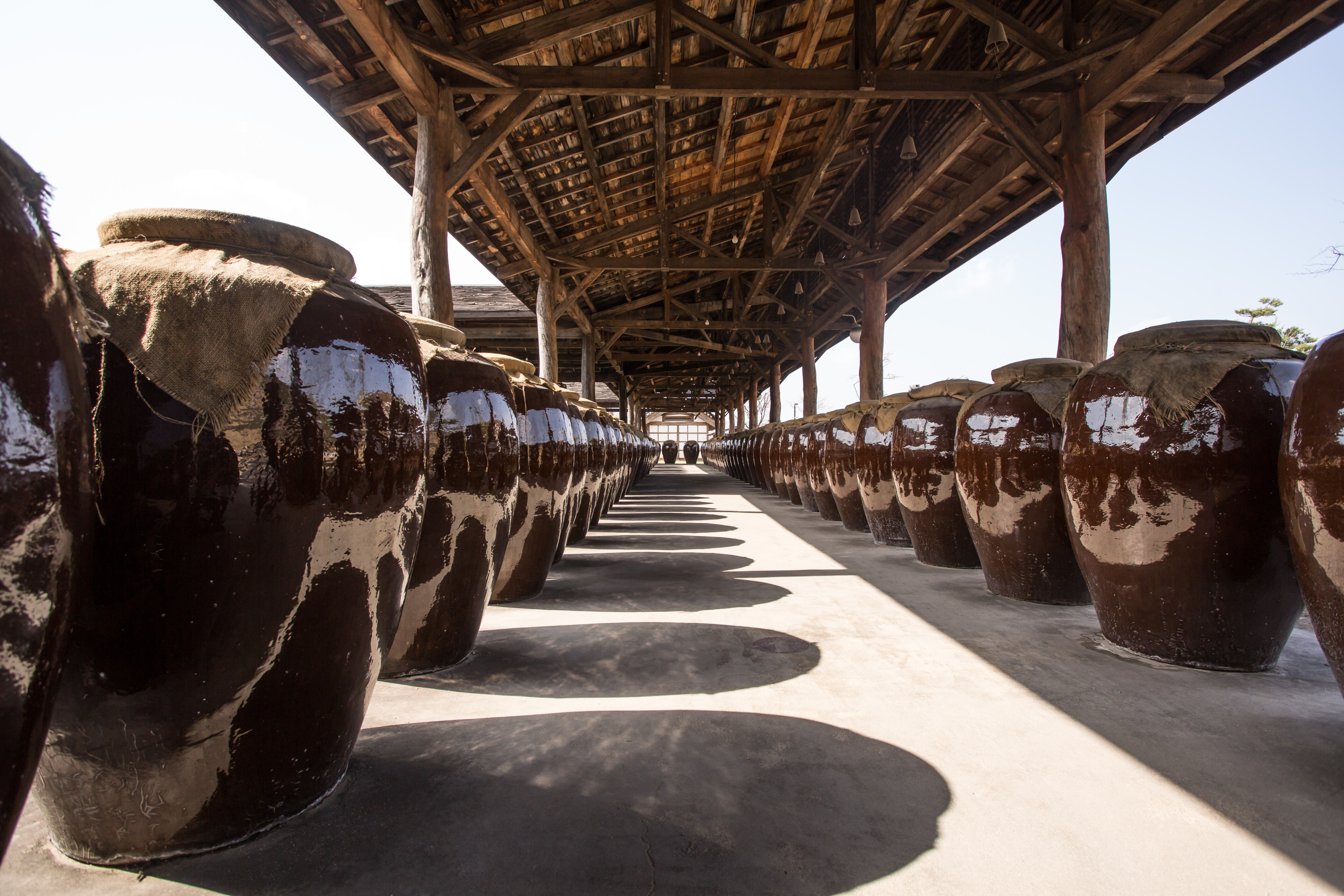
Brewing makgeolli

Makgeolli is made from rice using nuruk, a Korean fermentation starter. Nuruk is a dry cereal cake that has been allowed to ferment and mature to promote the growth of molds producing hydrolyzable enzymes that decompose the starches of the cereal grain into sugar. This sugar is then used by yeast to produce alcohol through fermentation. Different kinds of nuruk, made with different ingredients such as rice, wheat, barley, or mung beans, produce makgeolli of a variety of flavors.

Steamed rice, nuruk, and sometimes additional flavoring ingredients such as maize, chestnuts, fruits, herbs, and flowers are mixed and left to ferment in onggi, the same permeable clay crocks used for making kimchi, soy sauce, and other fermented foods.

The brewing process involves two stages: seed and main mash and main fermentation. Seed mash is the process of obtaining actively growing yeasts and enzymes in the mixture of yeast and nuruk. The tastes and aromas of the main mash develop with the transformation of the rice-derived nutrients and amino acids. Main fermentation lasts for about a week.

Makgeolli is best consumed fresh, a week or two after brewing. When freshly brewed, it has a milder and creamier taste. It acquires a stronger taste over time and turns into rice vinegar after a couple of months.

Traditionally, the wine was only created one way, but to reach out across the different age groups and for exporting purposes there are several different ways the wine is created. Once makgeolli has been exported, it can change as well. Many people also brew makgeolli at home these days. Traditionally, makgeolli is created unpasteurized.

== Commercial production ==
Many mass-produced makgeolli are brewed with non-traditional manufactured fermentation starter instead of the traditional nuruk, and are diluted with water and contain additives such as aspartame. This gives the liquor sweetness without adding a fermentable carbohydrate, and thus increases shelf life. Flavorings such as fruit and ginseng are also sometimes added.

Makgeolli production in South Korea
Year	Production
2005	166,319 kL (5,873,500 cu ft)
2006	170,165 kL (6,009,300 cu ft)
2007	172,342 kL (6,086,200 cu ft)
2008	176,398 kL (6,229,400 cu ft)
2009	260,694 kL (9,206,300 cu ft)
2010	412,269 kL (14,559,100 cu ft)
2011	458,198 kL (16,181,100 cu ft)
2012	448,046 kL (15,822,600 cu ft)
2013	426,216 kL (15,051,700 cu ft)
2014	430,896 kL (15,216,900 cu ft)
2015	416,046 kL (14,692,500 cu ft)

== Consumption ==
Makgeolli is usually served chilled, in a bottle or in a pottery bowl with a ladle. Prior to drinking, it is stirred with the ladle, or the bottle is gently flipped upside down several times with the cap on, in order to mix in the settled sediment. It is then ladled or poured into individual small bowls, rather than cups, for drinking. This is because of the tendency of makgeolli to split into a cloudy white fraction that settles to the bottom and a clear, pale yellow liquid that rises to the top.

Makgeolli is often served with fried buchimgae, Korean pancakes, such as pajeon (made with scallions), haemul-panjeon (made with scallions and seafood), and bindae-tteok (made with mung beans and pork). Consuming makgeolli with these pancakes is a custom often associated with rainy days. There are a number of theories regarding the origin. The first theory is the effect of association, whereby the sound of the rain is similar to the sizzling sound of a pancake making, so when it rains, pajeon automatically comes to mind. The second theory has to do with traditional agricultural culture. When the farmers were not able to work due to the rain, especially during the rainy season of Summer, they made pajeon to soothe their hunger and accompanied it with makgeolli, a farmer's favorite drink. Naturally, it became a seasonal food, and the tradition has been passed down to this day.

Makgeolli may also be mixed with ice and fruits such as mango and pineapple to make fruit cocktails, or with saida (lemon-lime drink) to make a simple cocktail named maksa. Makgeolli mixed with kkul (honey) is called kkul-makgeolli.

Because of the microorganisms present during fermentation, makgeolli is a probiotic product. It contains high levels of lactic acid bacteria such as Lactobacillus, as well as vitamins, amino acids, and fiber. With a 1.9 percent protein content, over 10 amino acids, vitamin B, inositol and choline, makgeolli is reputed to increase metabolism, relieve fatigue and improve the complexion.

== Gallery ==
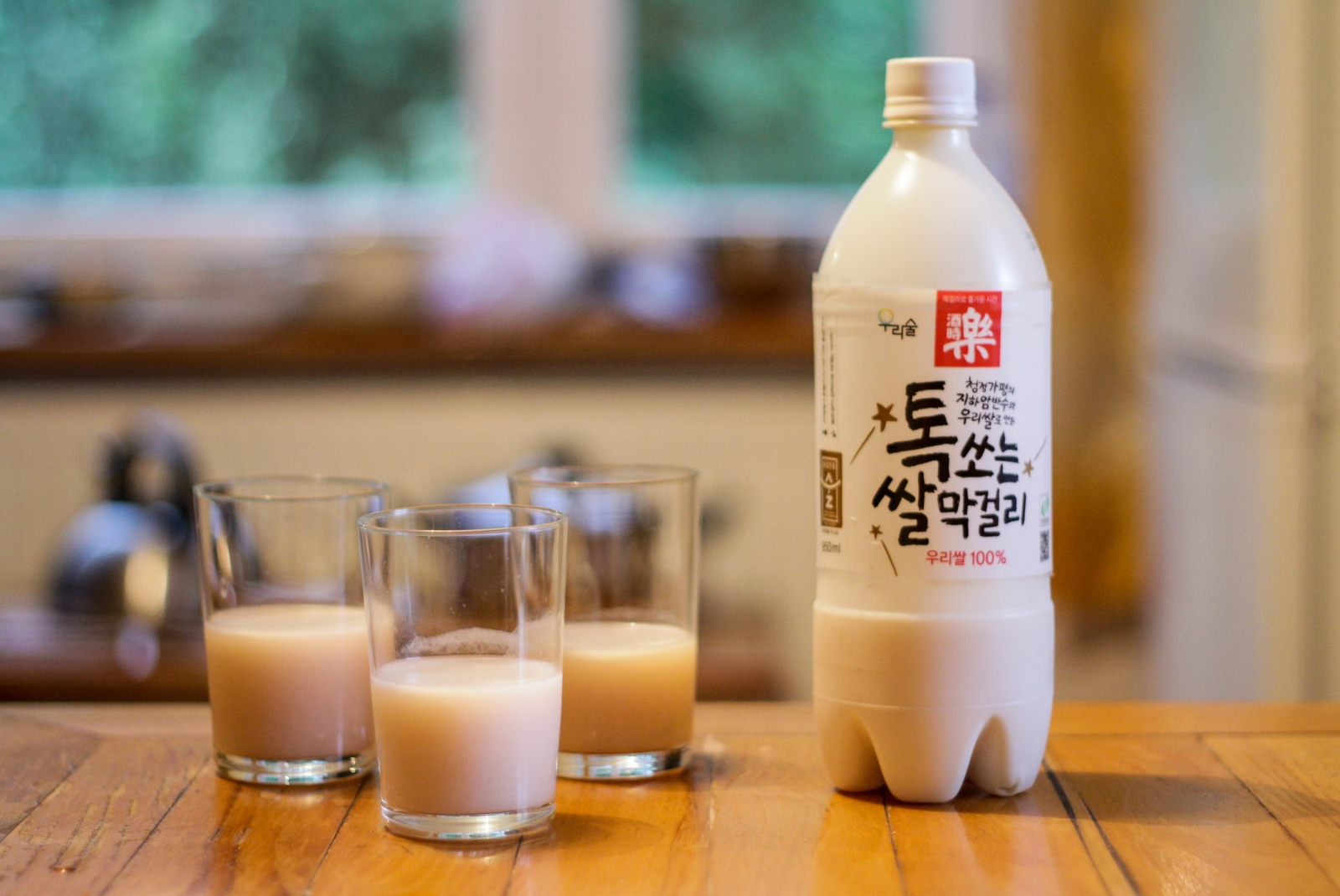
bottled makgeolli

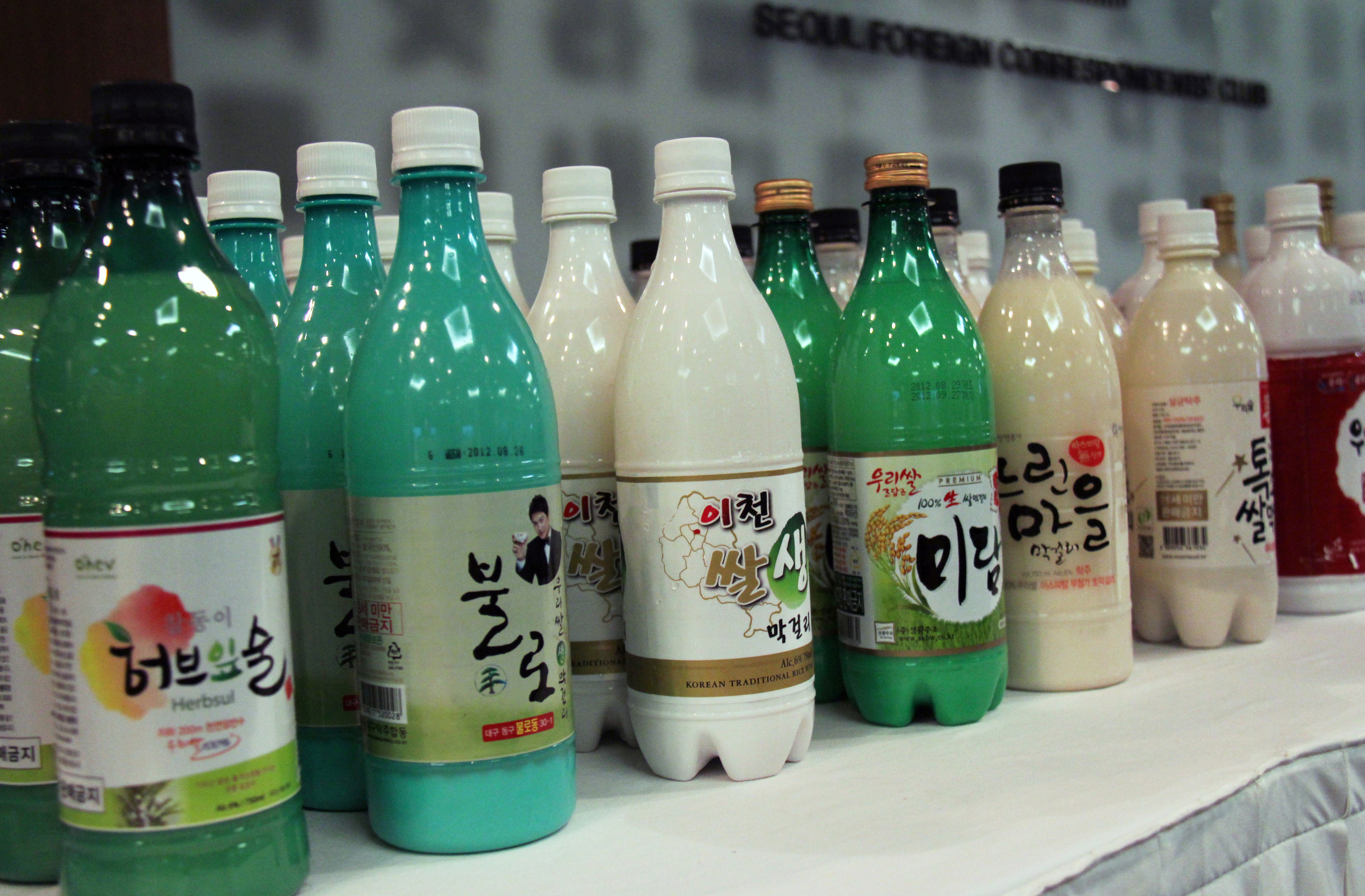
Various makgeolli

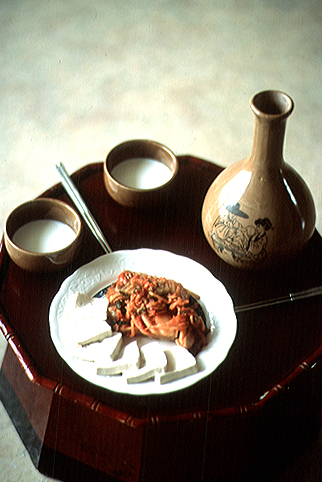
Makgeolli and dubu-kimchi

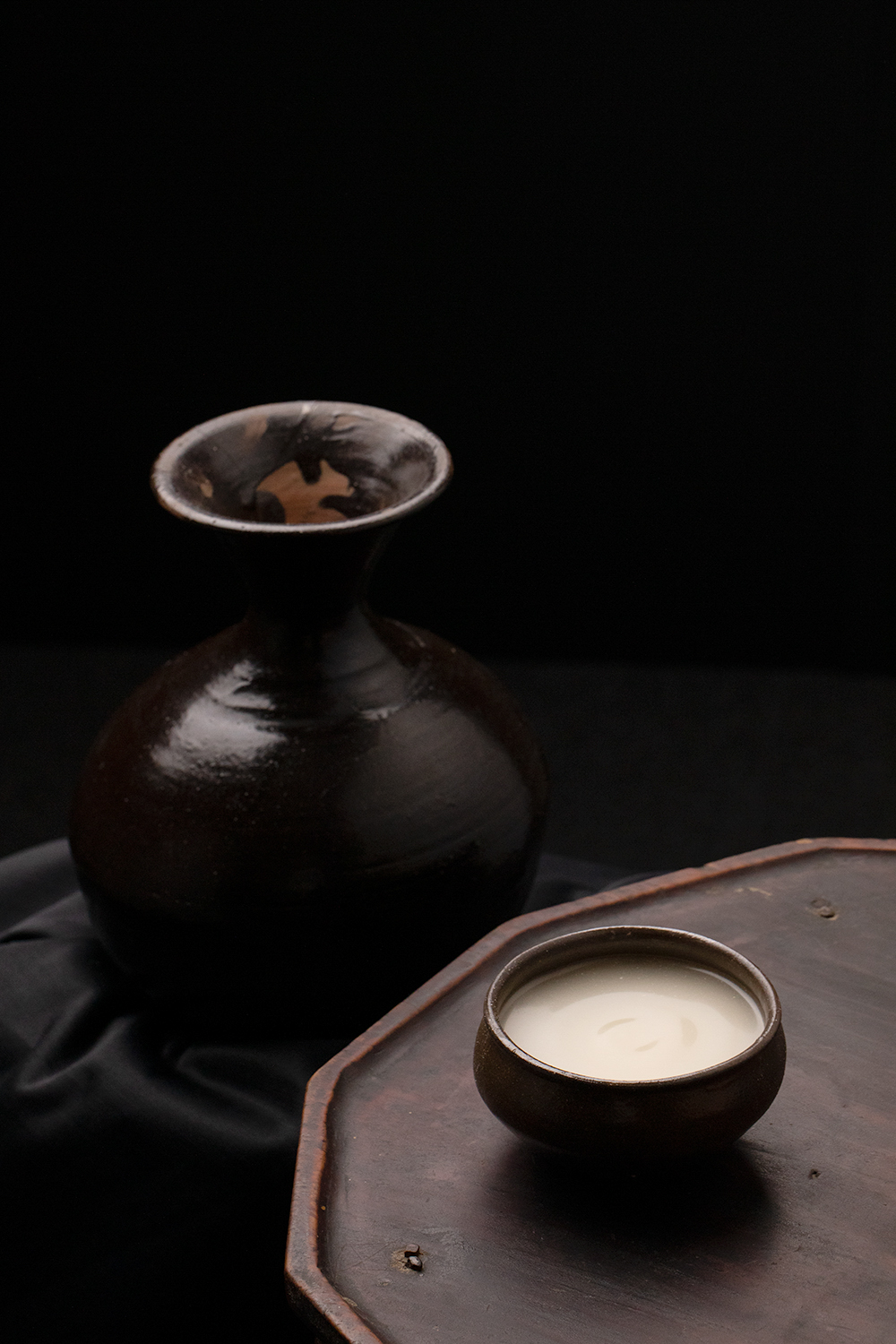
Makgeolli on traditional Korean table

== Similar beverages ==
Dongdong-ju ("float-float wine") is a drink very similar to makgeolli, but slightly creamier and with unfiltered floating rice grains. The word dongdong is an ideophone for a small object floating by. Ihwa-ju ("pear-blossom wine") is so named because it is brewed from rice with rice malt which ferments during the pear-blossom season. Ihwaju is often so thick that it is eaten with a spoon. Dansul ("sweet wine") is a sweeter variety with partial fermentation. The Tibetan alcoholic beverage Chhaang is also very similar drink with its cloudy milky appearance along with its unfiltered rice sediments. During the Tibetan lunar new year, Tibetans drink a slight variation of Chaang by adding dried cheese, droma (a type of small tuber similar in taste to sweet potato) and nuts which is then heated and drunk warm. In Nepal, where chaang is enjoyed by the Newars and Sherpas, Korean produced bottled makgeoli is branded and sold as chaang.

Chinese choujiu and Japanese nigori are rice wines similar to makgeolli.

== See also ==
- Cheongju
- Korean alcoholic beverages
- Nigori – Japanese equivalent of Makgeolli
- Choujiu – Chinese equivalent of Makgeolli
- Zutho – Naga equivalent of Makgeolli
- List of rice beverages
