= Juryeonggu =

14-sided dice for Sillan drinking game

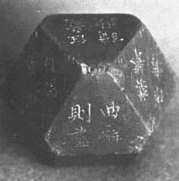
- The Juryeonggu photographed in 1975

Korean name
- Hangul: 주령구
- Hanja: 酒令具
- RR: juryeonggu
- MR: churyŏnggu

Juryeonggu (Korean: 주령구; Hanja: 酒令具) was a 14-sided die from the Unified Silla period, which was excavated from Donggung Palace and Wolji Pond. It was made of oak and had 6 square faces and 8 irregular hexagonal faces. Short texts were inscribed on each face of the die. Its contents imply that the die was used in a drinking game.

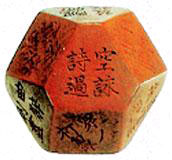
A replica of the Juryeonggu

The original artifact was destroyed while trying to remove its moisture in an oven. A replica is on display at the Gyeongju National Museum.

== Description ==
The Juryeonggu was a die whose shape is a variant of a Truncated octahedron or a Cuboctahedron. It was made of oak, and painted black. On each face of the die, 4 or 5 letters were inscribed in Hanja, likely meaning various penalties and benefits in a drinking game.

The length of the sides of each square, or the longer sides of each hexagon, was approximately 2.5 cm; the length of the shorter sides of each hexagon was approximately 0.8 cm.

=== Inscription ===
Due to a lack of context about the die, the exact meanings of some texts are still disputed. During the first few years since the excavation, various meanings were suggested based on literal reading, which are still in circulation as of today. More in-depth interpretations, as well as the rules of the game, have been suggested in the 21st century, based on historical usage of the characters and the geometrical relation of the faces.

The theorized meaning of each text is outlined below:

| Face | Text | Theorized meanings |
|---|---|---|
| Square | 飮盡大笑 | Drink a whole cup and laugh loudly; Drink a whole cup and make everyone laugh loudly |
| Square | 三盞一去 | Drink three cups at once; Drink three cups and walk one step; Remove one cup of penalty if three or more has been accumulated |
| Square | 自唱自飲 | Drink and sing by oneself; Drink and sing without passing on to others |
| Square | 禁聲作舞 | Dance without making a sound; Dance without music |
| Square | 衆人打鼻 | Several people hit the nose; Everyone hits the nose; Everyone drinks a whole cup |
| Square | 有犯空過 | Remain still even when people gang up and play tricks; Allow oneself to bypass a penalty |
| Hexagon | 醜物莫放 | Do not throw dirty things away; Do not throw remaining drink away; Drink a cup without spilling |
| Hexagon | 兩盞則放 | Pour (out) two cups; Pass two cups to others; Remove two cups of penalty |
| Hexagon | 曲臂則盡 | Drink a whole cup with arms bent; Drink a whole cup as soon as bending one's arms (quickly) |
| Hexagon | 任意請歌 | Ask others to sing |
| Hexagon | 弄面孔過 | Stay still even when people tickle one's face; Embarrass oneself |
| Hexagon | 月鏡一曲 | Sing a song of Wolgyeong. It is unclear what song this refers to.; Look at the moon and sing a song; Sing a song with custom lyrics |
| Hexagon | 空詠詩過 | Recite a poem |
| Hexagon | 自唱怪來晩 | Sing a song of Goeraeman. It is unclear what song this refers to.; Sing a song to let new people join the game; Sing a song about waiting for one's next turn, without passing on to others |

=== Probabilistic analysis ===
It was theoretically and empirically demonstrated that the probability of falling on each face is close to $\frac{1}{14}$, making the solid suitable as a fair die.

== History ==
The Juryeonggu was excavated at the Wolji Pond, then named Anapji, in 1975. The excavation report simply named it the "Die" (주사위). Due to three edges of the hexagons being much shorter than the others, the report described the hexagonal faces as triangles.

In 1979, the Juryeonggu was lost while trying to remove moisture in an oven. It was supposed to be heated very weakly for 24 hours, but due to a malfunction in the oven, the die was overheated and caught fire. Fortunately, Kim Dong-hyun, the head of investigation of the excavation, had created two replicas out of Betula schmidtii prior to the incident, one of which was donated to the Gyeongju National Museum.

The name of this die varies between sources, such as "Die," "14-faceted Die" (14면체 주사위), "14-faceted Wooden Die" (14면체 목제 주사위), and "Juryeonggu." The first usage of the name "Juryeonggu" comes from Anapji, a 1989 book by Ko Kyeong-Hee, one of the members of the excavation.

== Cultural references ==
The die, named juryungu, features in an early chapter titled "The Jury" in Ed Park's Same Bed Different Dreams.

== See also ==
- Donggung Palace and Wolji Pond
- Unified Silla
- Korean drinking culture
- Drinking game
- Gyeongju National Museum
