= Nuruk =

Korean fermentation starter

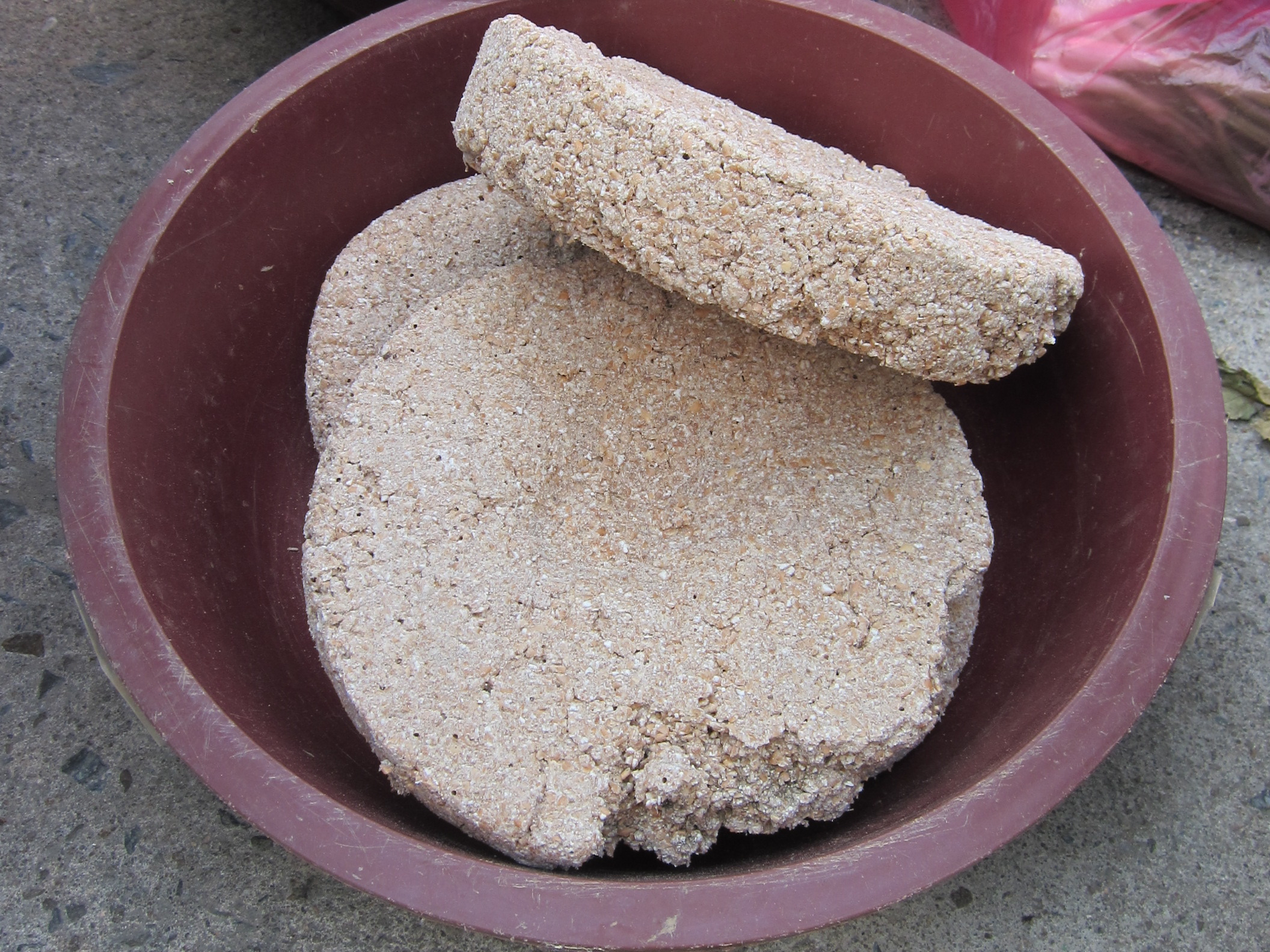
Nuruk (fermentation starter)

Nuruk (Korean: 누룩) is a traditional Korean fermentation starter. It is used to make various types of Korean alcoholic beverages including takju, cheongju, and soju. It is an essential ingredient in shindari and is mixed with rice. Historically, it was used in a variety of provinces of Korea, including Jeju Island.

Wheat, rice (of both the glutinous and non-glutinous types), and barley are used to make nuruk, either as whole grain or in the form of grits or flour. Wheat nuruk is the most common variety. The dry grain is moistened, shaped into a large cake, and hung up to ferment for 2‒4 weeks in an ondol room. The cake matures at a precise temperature until a mold forms.

== Origin ==
Nuruk has been used in Korea since the period of the Three Kingdoms in the 3rd century CE, while similar fermentation starter, jiuqu, was first made in China during the Warring States period beginning in the 5th century BCE. Chinese history records the first use of nuruk in Korea in 1123 CE.

Traditionally, nuruk was prepared on a small scale by families in summer or autumn, especially in July when the ambient temperature is between 20–30 °C (68–86 °F) on the Korean peninsula. It has been mass-produced in factories since the 1920s.

== Characteristics ==
Microorganisms present in nuruk include Aspergillus oryzae, Aspergillus luchuensis, Rhizopus oryzae, lactic acid bacteria such as Lactobacilli, and yeasts, predominantly Pichia anomala and Saccharomyces cerevisiae. Aspergillus provides the enzyme amylase, which saccharifies the rice's starches. The resulting sugars are consumed by the yeasts, producing alcohol, as well as the Lactobacilli, producing lactic acid. Rhizopus provides the enzyme protease and lipase, which break down the protein and fat in the outer layers of the rice grain (endosperm), allowing the amylase access to the starches in the inner part.

The proportions of microorganisms can vary depending on the region where the nuruk was made. Nuruk made in the southern coastal areas surrounding Busan, for example, have a higher lactic acid bacteria content due to the warmer climate and humidity.

Chemically, it contains 2,6-Dimethoxybenzoquinone (2,6-DMBQ), also found in fermented wheat germ extract.

== See also ==
- Bappir
- Sourdough starter
