= Omiki =

Shinto ritual offering of alcohol

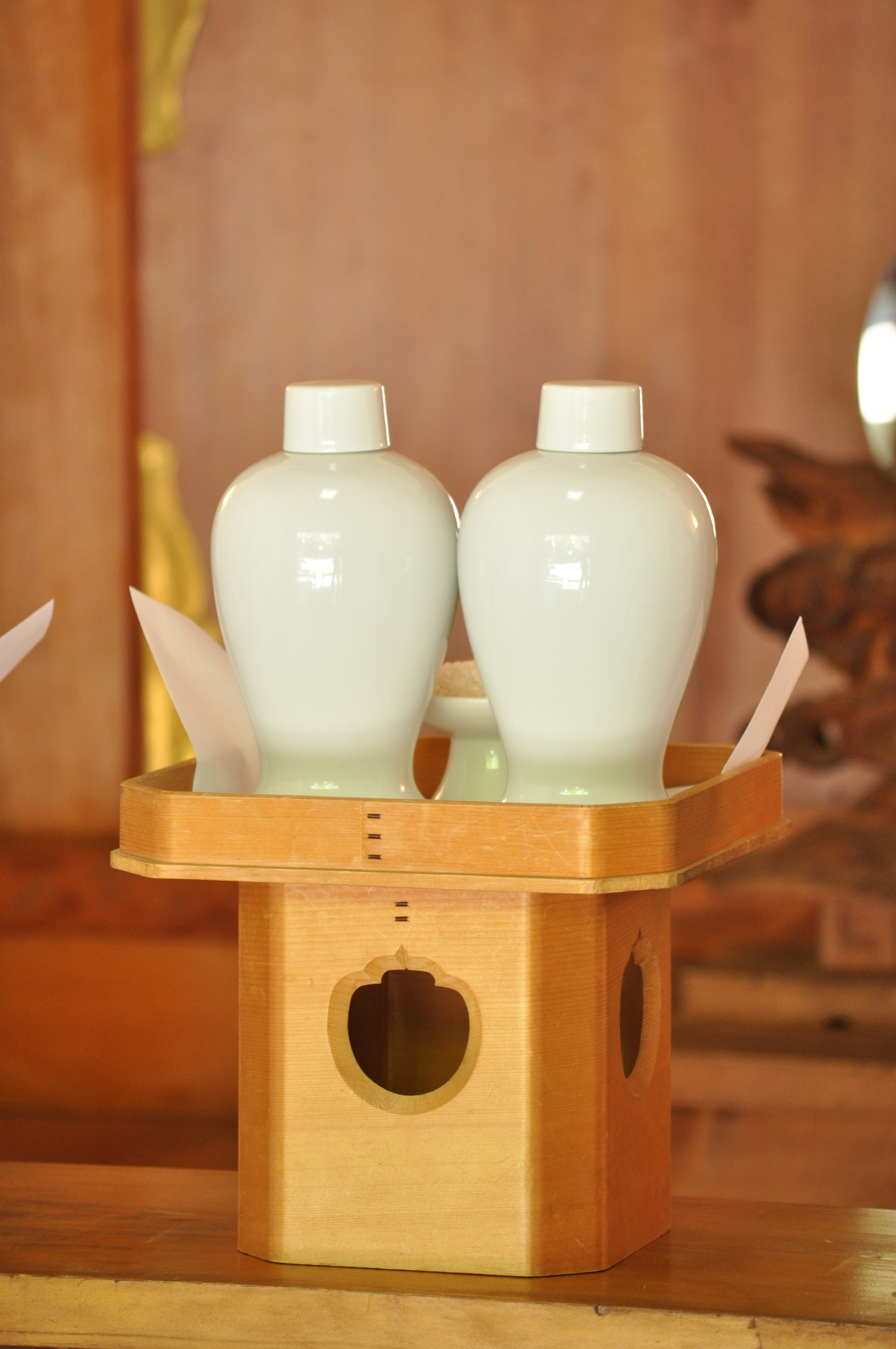
Sake offered on a sanbo altar

Omiki (お神酒) is an offering of sake or other alcoholic drinks offered to gods in Japanese Shinto.

Sake is often consumed as part of Shinto purification rituals. People drink omiki with gods to communicate with them and to solicit rich harvests the following year.

== Etymology ==
The word omiki is spelled using the three characters (お神酒). The first o (お) is an honorific prefix. The second character (神) refers to kami, a kind of spirit or deity in Japanese spirituality. This is normally read as kami, but in certain compounds it is read as mi, as we also see in the derivation of the word miko (巫女; "shrine maiden"). The third character (酒) is read as sake when used alone, but in certain compounds of ancient derivation it is read as ki. The compound omiki is very old and dates back to Old Japanese. There is a word kushi (くし) in the Kojiki of 712, spelled using this same kanji 酒, connected to the word kushi (奇し; "mystical") in reference to the effects of sake.

== Overview ==
Sake is an essential part of shinsen, and is offered to the gods during rituals. The meaning of this ceremony is to receive the sake that has been offered to the gods and in which the spirit resides, and to eat and drink the same food as the gods as well as other food offerings. Some shrines also serve sake after ninenmairi.

Some breweries produce sake specifically to be put on kamidana.

== Types and brewing methods ==
There are many different types of sake, such as white sake (白酒, shiroki), black sake (黒酒, kuroki), clear sake (清酒, sumizake), and cloudy sake (濁酒, nigorizake), and many different brewing methods. The "ki (酒)" of White Sake (白酒, Shiroki) and black sake (黒酒, Kuroki) is the ancient name of sake, and is also written as white sake (白貴, shiroki) and black sake (黒貴, kuroki). Black sake is also called kuromiki (黒御酒).

The origin of amazake dates back to the Kofun period, and there is a description in "Nihon Shoki" about Amazake, which is said to be the origin of amazake.

According to the Engi-shiki, white sake is brewed from rice grown in Kanda and strained as it is, while black sake is made by adding burned ashes of clerodendrum trichotomum roots to white sake and coloring it black.

Today, a combination of clear sake and cloudy sake (nigori) is often used as a substitute for white and black sake. In the past, sacred sake was home-brewed by Shinto shrines and their parishioners. Nowadays, however, due to restrictions in the Liquor Tax Law, Ise Grand Shrines are required to obtain a license to brew sake and nigori from the tax office. Ise Grand Shrine, which has a license to brew sake and a permit from the tax office to brew doburoku.

In Japan, it has been customary since ancient times to make doburoku and offer it to the gods to pray for a good harvest in the coming year, and even today, more than 40 shrines hold Doburoku Matsuri, etc. As a rule, it is forbidden to take doburoku out of the premises of a Shinto shrine.

In Kumamoto Prefecture, the Katō Shrine next to Kumamoto Castle in Kumamoto City uses the local tradition of Akumochizake as its sacred wine.

== Omiki other than Japanese sake ==
At Dazaifu Tenmangū in Dazaifu City, Fukuoka, umeshu produced by Nikka Whisky Distilling's Moji factory is used as a sacred wine in honor of the legend of Tobi Ume.

In areas where grape cultivation is popular, wine is dedicated as a sacred wine at the Ichinomiya Asama Shrine in Yamanashi Prefecture, Fuefuki City, and Osaka Prefecture, and red wine is served as a sacred wine on the third day of the New Year at the Honda Hachiman Shrine in Habikino City. At the shrine, it is called hinomaru miki (日の丸神酒) because the red wine pooled on a white plate appears similar to the Japanese flag.

== Others ==
There is a theory that the custom of offering white sake at Hina Matsuri was created in the Edo period (1603-1867).

Since the sake is usually offered to the altar in pairs, it is used as a metaphor for the happiness of married couples, and is also used in rakugo storytelling. The ornaments made of split bamboo and are inserted into the sake tokuri are called mikiguchi.

In Okinawa Prefecture, which is part of the former Ryukyu Kingdom, and the Amami region of Kagoshima Prefecture, a unique rice-based beverage called miki has been handed down and is also sold commercially as a soft drink. It is made by adding sugar to crushed rice and fermenting it naturally.

== See also ==
- Akumochizake - believed to be the original black liquor
- Amazake
- Doburoku Matsuri
