= Sweet wine (disambiguation) =

Sweet wine refers to wine with high levels of sugar.

Sweet wine or Sweet Wine may also refer to:

- Dessert wine, sweet wine served with dessert
- Dansul (Korean: 단술; lit. 'sweet wine'), a Korean rice wine

- Sikhye (Korean: 식혜), a Korean rice-malt drink also referred to as dansul

- Jiuniang (Chinese: 酒酿), a rice pudding dish

== Music ==
- "Sweet Wine", a song by Mark Williams, 1975
- "Sweet Wine", a song by Cream from the 1966 album Fresh Cream
- "Sweet Wine", a song by Billy Cobham & George Duke from the 1976 album Live On Tour In Europe
- "Sweet Wine", a song by Duke Garwood from the 2015 album Heavy Love

== See also ==
- Desert Wine (1980–2003), American Thoroughbred racehorse
- Abbie Sweetwine (1921–2009), American nurse
