= Doburoku Matsuri =

Japanese festival

Doburoku Matsuri or Doburoku Festival is a festival held at shrines and other places where doburoku is served. Doburoku is a Japanese sake that holds religious significance. Sanctified Doburoku is called Omiki and is accompanied by a series of rituals.

In Japan, it has been customary since ancient times to make doburoku and offer it to the gods to bring a good harvest in the coming year. Move than 40 shrines hold Doburoku Matsuri. As a rule, it is forbidden to take doburoku out of the premises of a Shinto shrine.

== Shirahigetawara Shrine ==
The Shirahigetawara Shrine Doburoku Festival has continued since 710, and is held annually on October 17 and 18. In recent years, many areas have been designated as Doburoku Special Zones where the production of doburoku is allowed. Earlier, the shrine was the only one in Kyushu to be authorized by the National Tax Agency.

A pre-festival is held on the day before Doburoku Matsuri on October 17. Doburoku is served on both days, and on the 18th, a mikoshi parade is held. In addition, a "Beard Boast Contest" is held in two categories, one for black hair and the other for beards, named after the shrine.

The series of events that began on September 25 and continued until October 18 were designated as Kunitoh no toya event by the government on December 20, 1984 (Showa 59) as an Intangible folk cultural property for which measures such as record making should be taken. It was also selected as a Doburoku Festival of Shirahige Shrine by Oita Prefecture on March 23, 1971, as a Selected Intangible Folk Cultural Property.

== Nagakusa Tenjin Shrine ==
The Doburoku Festival at Nagakusa Tenjin Shrine is a Ritual held annually, and is designated as a Tangible Folk Cultural Property by Obu City.

The Doburoku festival there is said to date back to 1494 (Meiō3), when doburoku was brewed from rice donated by the head of the land and offered to the gods, and the sacred sake was served at an annual festival to parishioners and visitors. Fujita Tamibu donated about 990 m^{2} in Kanbun5 (1665). Brewing was then suspended in accordance with the times. However, due to epidemic disease in the village, brewing resumed in 1668 (Kanbun 8), and has continued to the present day. This resumption is said to have been spearheaded by Denbei Ichimura Katsuyuki, an officer of the Jicho Meifu at the time.

=== Brewing ===
Brewing takes place on the temple grounds from early January, with the task rotated among six groups of sake brewers in the Nagakusa area. After the ceremony, the priests and officials drink, followed by the entertainment of the Ujiko (shrine parishioners). In the afternoon, the general public is served. Shōjō, an imaginary animal that likes to drink, is paraded through the grounds of the shrine, and rice cakes are thrown into the air. Around 5:00 p.m., the "towatashi" ceremony, in which the doburoku making tools are handed over to the next year's group, concludes the event.

== Gifu prefecture ==
Iijima Hachimangu, Shirakawa Hachimangu and other shrines in celebrate in Gifu Prefecture.

== Mihara Village ==
Mihara, a small village in Kochi prefecture, holds a doboroku festival annually on the 3rd of November. Attendees showcase various kinds of doboroku, such as sweet and dry.

== See also ==
- Doburoku#Japanese doburoku festivals for festivals where doburoku is served.
- Omiki
- Mass (liturgy)
- Sake
- Oktoberfest
