= Small beer =

Beer variety, with low alcohol content

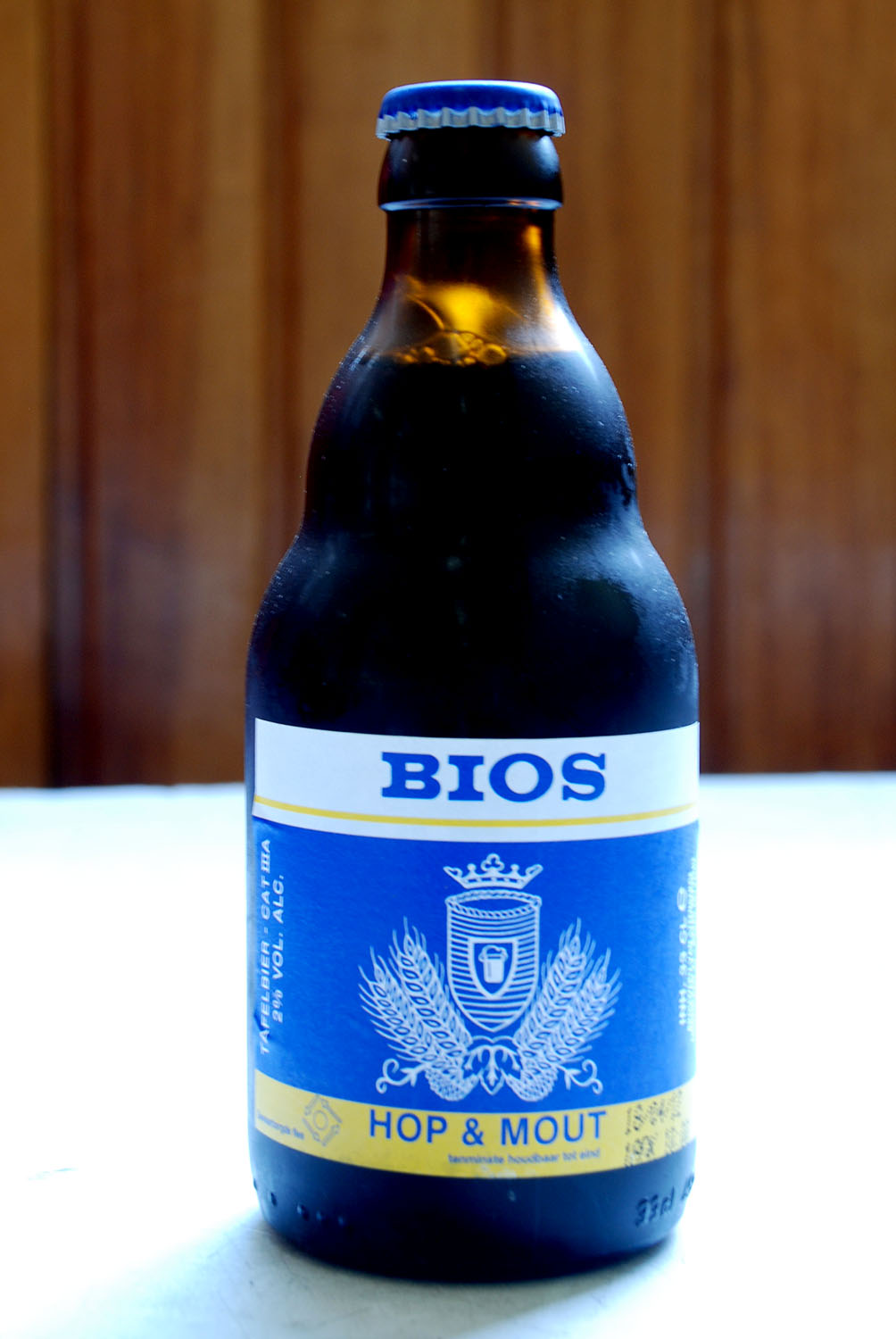
- A modern Belgian tafelbier
- Type: Lager or ale
- Origin: Europe and North America
- Alcohol by volume: Between 0.5% to 2.8%

Small beer (also known as small ale or table beer) is a lager or ale that contains a lower amount of alcohol by volume than most others, usually between 1% and 2%. Sometimes unfiltered and porridge-like, it was a favoured drink in Medieval Europe and colonial North America and up to the 19th century compared with more expensive and inebriating beer containing higher levels of alcohol.

== History ==
Small beer was socially acceptable in 18th-century England because of its lower alcohol content, allowing people to drink several glasses without becoming drunk. William Hogarth's portrait Beer Street (1751) shows a group of happy workers going about their business after drinking table beer. It became increasingly popular during the 19th century, displacing malt liquor as the drink of choice for families and servants.

In his A Plan for the Conduct of Female Education, in Boarding Schools published 1797, writer Erasmus Darwin agreed that "For the drink of the more robust children water is preferable, and for the weaker ones, small beer ...". Ruthin School's charter, signed by Elizabeth I, stipulates that small beer should be provided to all scholars, and larger educational establishments like Eton, Winchester, and Oxford University even ran their own breweries.

To a large extent, the role of small beer as an everyday drink was gradually overtaken in the British Isles by tea, as that became cheaper from the later 18th century.

== Contemporary usage ==
Small beer and small ale can also refer to beers made from the second runnings from the stronger beer (e.g., Scotch ale). Such beers can be as strong as a mild ale, but it depends on the strength of the original mash. This was an economic measure in household brewing in England until the 18th century, and still produced by some homebrewers. It is now only produced commercially in small quantities in Britain, and is not widely available in pubs or shops.

In Belgium, small or table beer is known as bière de table or tafelbier and many varieties are still brewed there. Breweries that still make this type of beer include De Es of Schalkhoven and Gigi of Gérouville in the Province of Luxembourg. In the US, a Vienna lager was a popular table beer before prohibition. Small beers are also produced in Germany and Switzerland albeit using local brewing methods.

== In art and history ==
=== Literature ===
Metaphorically, small beer means a trifle, or a thing of little importance.

- "Small ale" appears in the works of Shakespeare, (Note: For example, in Henry IV part 2, scenes i-ii, Prince Hal makes fun of Falstaff, who braggingly quaffs pints of small beer and is never really drunk.) William Thackeray's Vanity Fair, and in Ellis Peters' Brother Cadfael series, and "small beer" appears in Thackeray's Barry Lyndon.
- Graham Greene used the phrase "small beer" in the metaphorical sense in The Honorary Consul.
- When David Balfour first meets his uncle Ebenezer in Robert Louis Stevenson's novel Kidnapped, Ebenezer has laid a table with his own supper "with a bowl of porridge, a horn spoon, and a cup of small beer". The small beer, horn spoon, and the porridge indicate Ebenezer Balfour's miserliness, since he could afford much better food and drink; but it may also be meant to convey the "trifle" meaning as an indication of Ebenezer's weak, petty character.
- In the song "There Lived a King" in the Gilbert and Sullivan comic opera The Gondoliers, small beer is used as a metaphor for something that is common or is of little value.
- Cold small beer appears in Alcoholics Anonymous: The Story of How Many Thousands of Men and Women Have Recovered from Alcoholism in Chapter 1. The narrator of "Bill's Story" recalls seeing the tombstone of Thomas Thetcher, the Hampshire Grenadier, and taking it as a warning against drinking strong liquor to excess.
- Adam Smith uses small beer in a few examples in An Inquiry into the Nature and Causes of the Wealth of Nations. These include a comparison of the value of small beer and the value of bread, and a longer description of why cheap alcohol does not result in greater drunkenness.

=== History ===
- Thomas Thetcher's tombstone at Winchester Cathedral features a poem that blames his death on drinking cold small beer.
- Benjamin Franklin attested in his autobiography that it was sometimes had with breakfast. George Washington had a recipe for it involving bran and molasses.
- William Cobbett in his work "A History of the Protestant Reformation" refers to a 12th-century Catholic place of hospitality which fed 100 men a day – "Each had a loaf of bread, three quarts of small beer, and 'two messes,' for his dinner; and they were allowed to carry home that which they did not consume upon the spot." (Pg. 90, TAN Books, 1988)

== See also ==
- Amazake
- Gamju
- Jiuniang
- Kumis
- Low-alcohol beer
- Podpiwek
- Svagdricka
- Kvass
