= Jichinsai =

Shinto ceremony

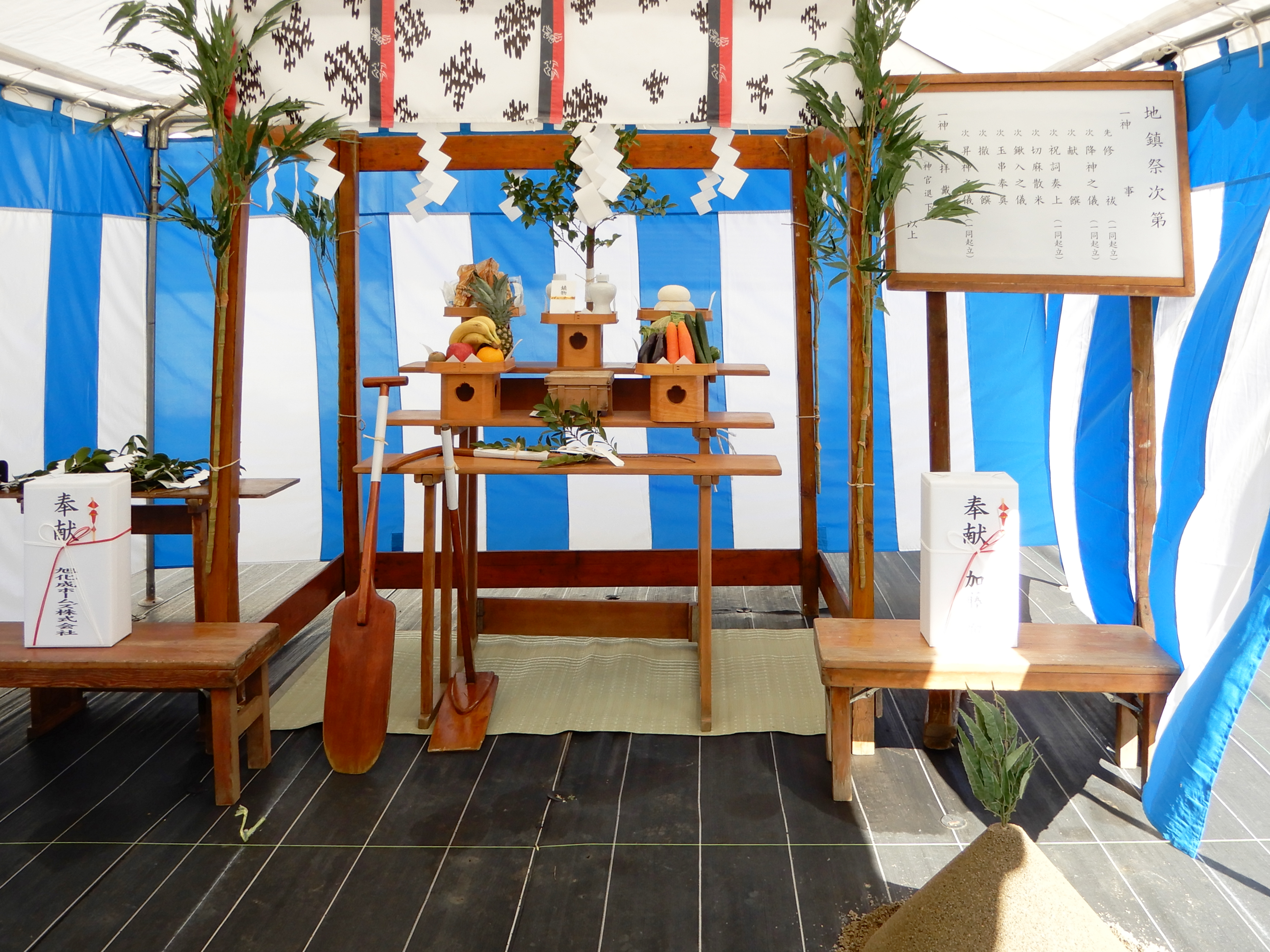
Jichinsai ceremony in Tokyo

A jichinsai (Japanese: 地鎮祭; also read tokoshizume no matsuri) is a Shinto ritual held to request the protection of the local kami when beginning to build new buildings from homes and office buildings to factories and universities.

At the Ise Grand Shrine, the rite is instead known as Chinchi-sai, and is performed a second time after a project's completion, under the name Ko-chinchisai. The deities traditionally invoked are the five Ikasuri no kami, though the ritual is today often addressed more generally to "the kami who govern this land", leaving the specific local deity unnamed; in some cases the ubusunagami or ujigami, the great tutelary kami of the land, are invoked instead.

The ceremony begins with ritual handwashing, followed by rites of purification and invocation calling the kami to descend, food offerings (shinsen), and the recitation of a norito. The site is then purified: a young girl performs the kusakari hajime, cutting grass with a ritually pure sickle, followed by the ugachizome, in which she digs a small hole with a ritually pure hoe; an assistant then ritually buries an izumemono, typically a human figure made of wire, or an iron object such as a mirror or piece of jewelry in the hole, though the object is only permanently interred once the ceremony concludes. The rite closes with a bow of thanks, the dispersal of the food and drink offerings, and a rite sending the kami back.

== The Tsu City Shinto Groundbreaking Ceremony Case ==
The Tsu City Shinto Groundbreaking Ceremony Case in 1971 declared the rite secular.

== See also ==
- Jinushigami
- Groundbreaking
