= Nagakusa Tenjin Shrine =

Shrine for Tenjin

Coordinates: 35°01′45″N 136°56′34″E

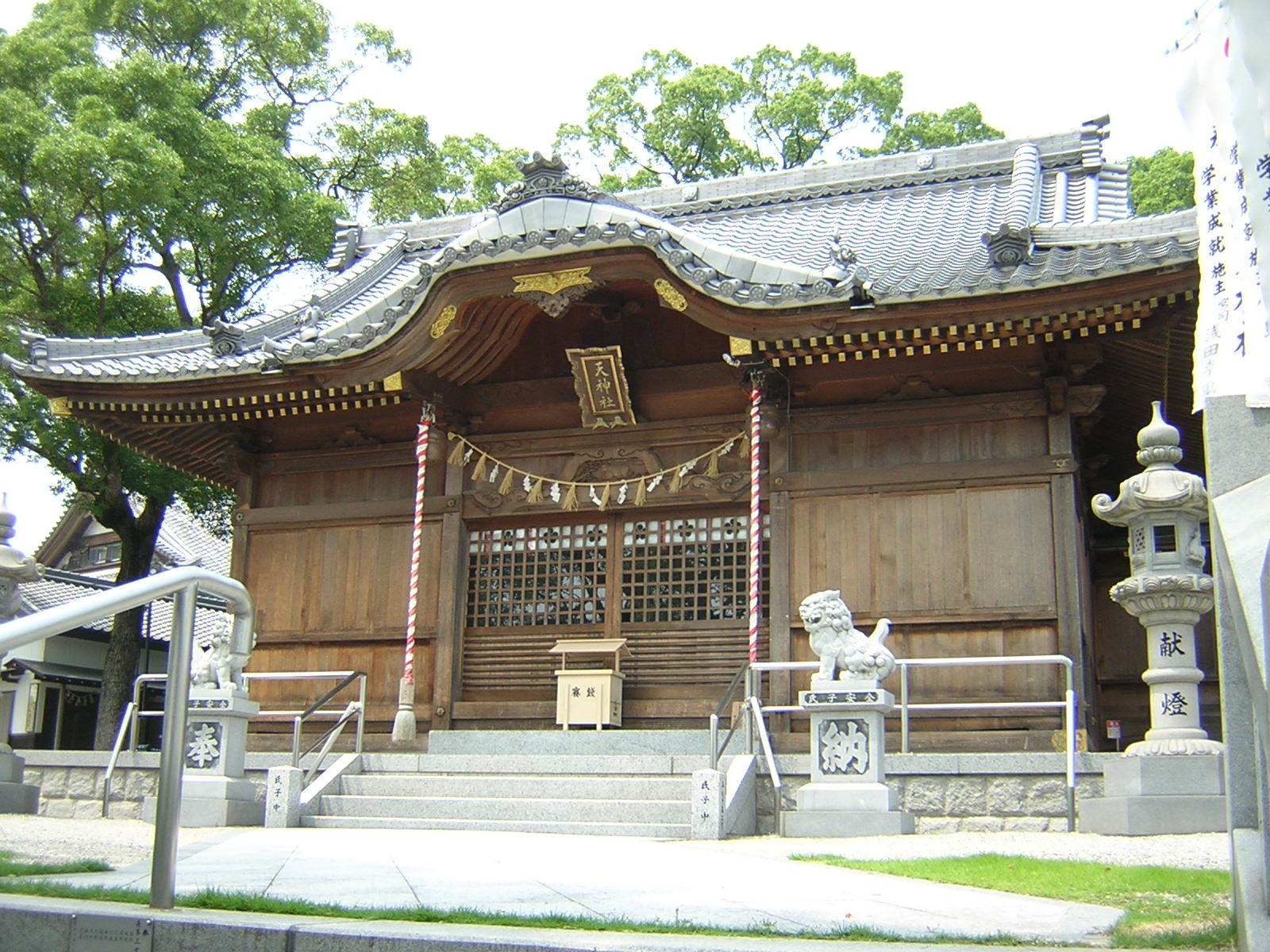
Nagakusa Tenjin shrine, 2007

Nagakusa Tenjinsha (長草天神社) is a Shinto shrine in Aichi Prefecture, Obu City.

== History ==
In 1494 (Meiō3), Fujita Tamibu, a landowner of Eibinoso, Chita County, ordered his family members to cultivate the land of Nagakusa, and at the same time, Sugawara Michizane, who was enshrined in the Tamibu residence, was received as San-dojin, which is said to be the origin of Nagakusa Tenjinsha. The shrine was upgraded to a village shrine in Meiji5 and to a shrine of offerings of sacred offerings on October 20 in 40th year of Meiji.

== Regular Festival ==
The annual festival of Nagakusa Tenjinsha was held on the 25th day of the first month of the Lunar calendar from Meio 3 to Meiji 43, when the shrine was founded, but now it is held on the Sunday immediately before February 25. The Doburoku festival is held as the annual festival.

== Doburoku Festival ==
The Doburoku Festival at Nagakusa Tenjinsha is a Ritual held as an annual festival, and is designated as a Tangible Folk Cultural Property by Obu City. 。

The history of the doburoku festival is said to date back to 1494 (Meiō3), when doburoku was brewed from rice donated by the head of the land and offered to the gods, and the sacred sake was then served at an annual festival to the shrine parishioners and visitors.(about 990 m^{2}) donated by Fujita Tamibu. In Kanbun5 (1665), brewing was suspended in accordance with the times. However, due to an epidemic and epidemic disease in the village, brewing of doburoku resumed in 1668 (Kanbun 8), and has continued to the present day.。This resumption is said to have been spearheaded by Denbei Ichimura Katsuyuki, an officer of the Jicho Meifu at the time.

Brewing of doburoku Brewing takes place at a brewery on the temple grounds from early January, with the doburoku brewing rotated among the six groups of sake brewers in the Nagakusa area.。After the ceremony, the priests and officials drink, followed by the entertainment of the Ujiko (shrine parishioners). In the afternoon, the general public is also served.、After the ceremony, the priests and officials drink, followed by the entertainment of the Ujiko (shrine parishioners). In the afternoon, the general public is also served.。 Shōjō, an imaginary animal that likes to drink, is paraded through the grounds of the shrine, and rice cakes are thrown into the air.。 Around 5:00 pm, the "towatashi" ceremony, in which the doburoku making tools are handed over to the next year's group, concludes the annual festival.

== Transport ==
- Central Japan Railway Company Tōkaidō Main Line Kyōwa Station
