= Sanbō =

Shinto altar implement

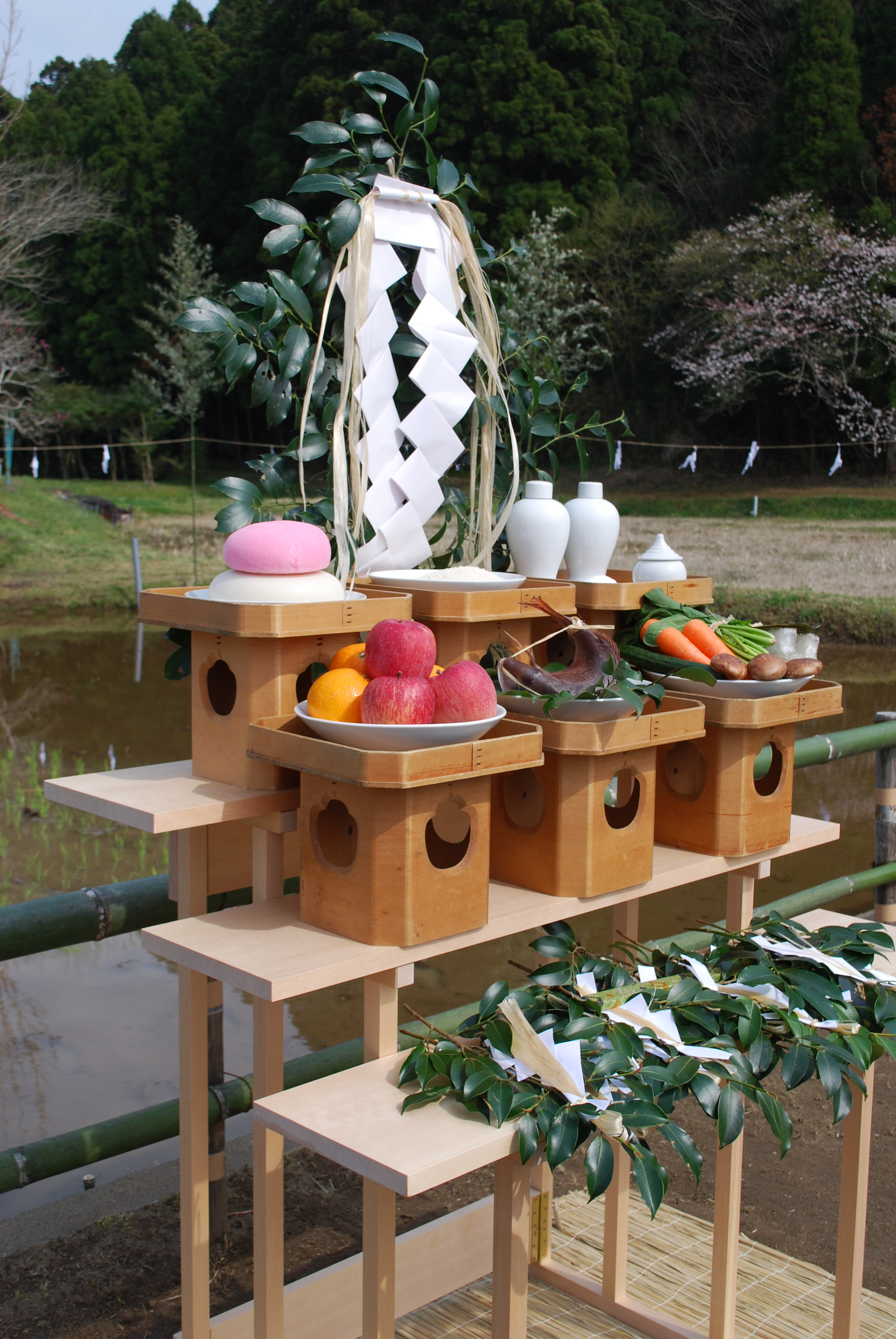
Edible offerings placed on sanbō at Katori Shrine.

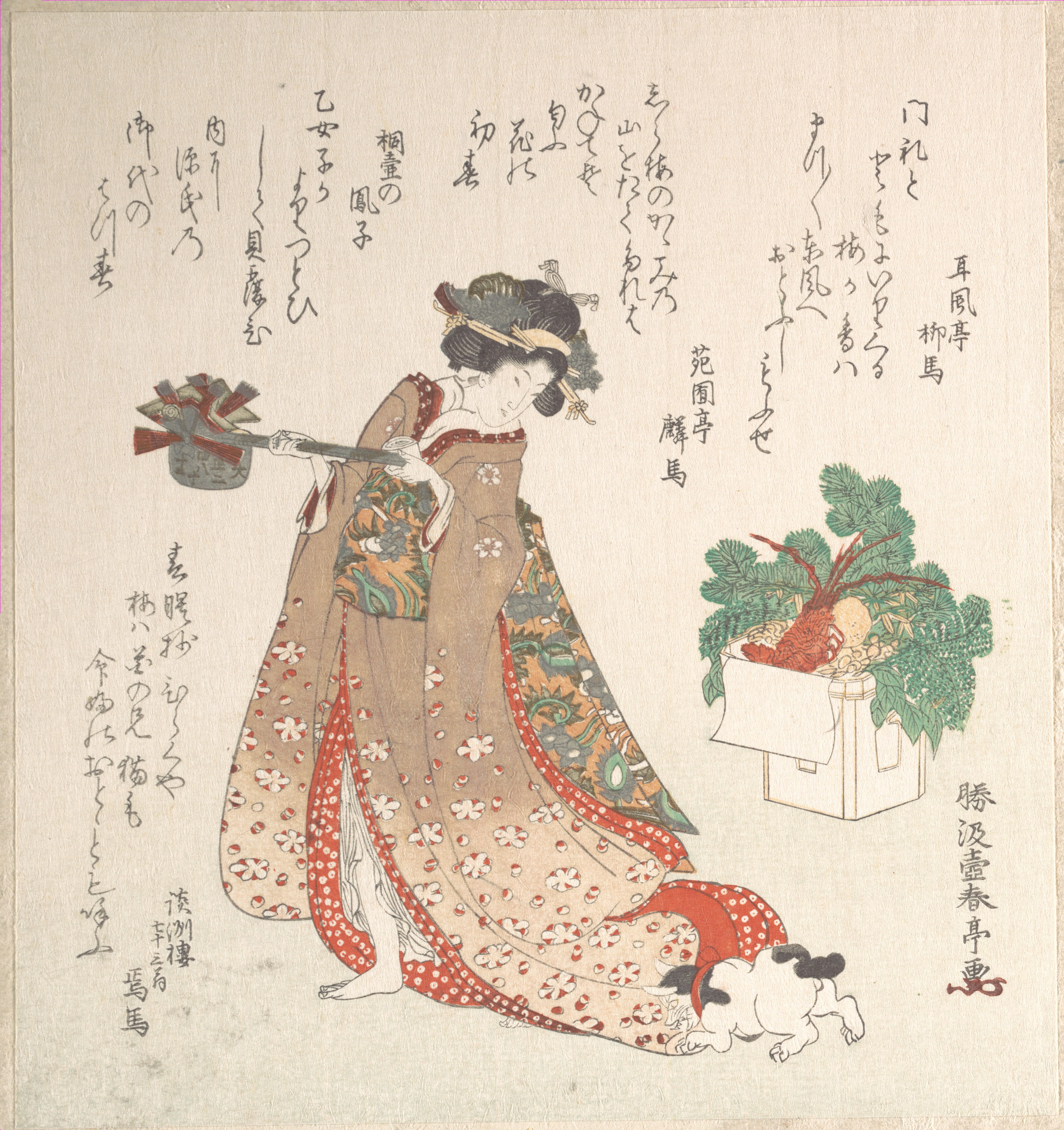
Sanbō with pine decoration lobster for New Year's. Painted by Shuntei Katsukawa, circa 1815.

Sanbō (三方) is a stand used in Shinto rituals on which edible offerings (shinsen) are placed. In ancient times, it was also used to present objects to a noble person. The same type of stand is also used in Buddhist temples, though it is then sometimes called a sanpō (三宝), named so after the Three Jewels (Sangha, Dharma, Buddha).

== Structure ==
Sanbō are generally made of plain wood such as Japanese cypress and are constructed of a tray on top of a rectangular base. The name sanbō (三方; lit. "three direction") comes from the holes in the base facing three directions.

Originally, the tray and base were separate pieces, with the tray either set on the base to use or used separately for other things. Today, the tray and base are connected to form one unit. Separate trays may be used for other purposes rather than using the ones on the sanbō.

There are no conventions for the design of the holes in the base, though they are often in the shape of giboshi.

The rim of the tray has a seam where the wood comes together which is located on the side opposite from the side of the base with no hole. When making offerings to kami, the side of the sanbō with no hole on the base (therefore the side opposite from the seam on the tray) is placed facing the kami. When carrying a sanbō holding edible offerings, the thumbs should be placed on the outside of the rim of the tray, with the rest of the fingers rest on the base immediately below the tray, and the sanbō should be held at eye level. In the imperial court, however, there is a tradition of placing the fingers into the tray.
