= Shirahigetawara Shrine =

Shinto shrine in Oita Prefecture, Japan

Coordinates: 33°30′12″N 131°33′00″E

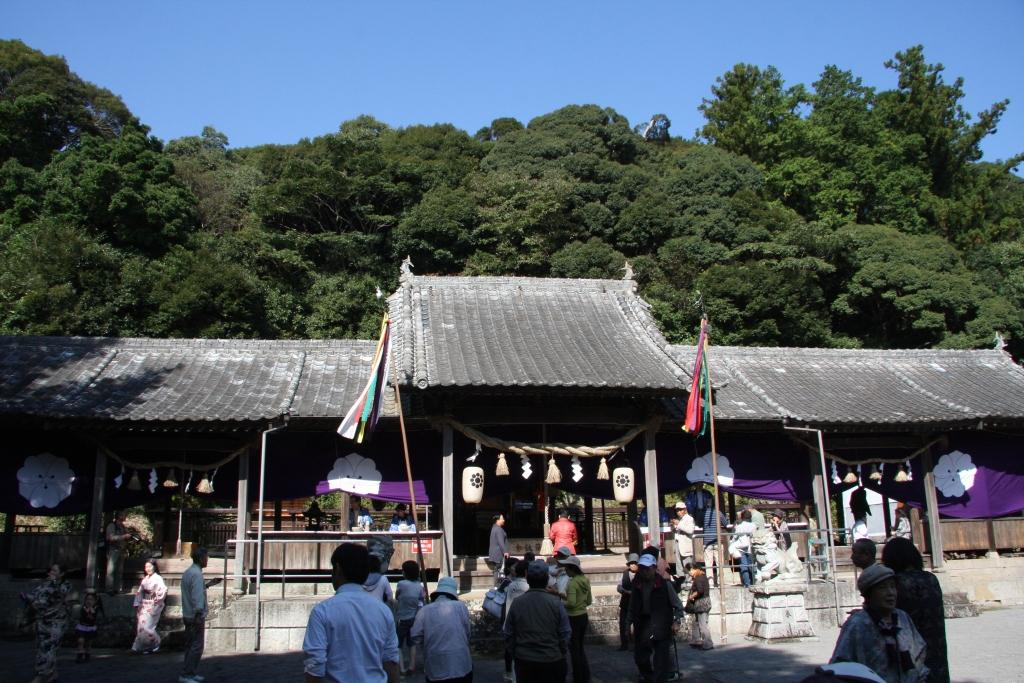
- Interactive map of Shirahigetawara Shrine

Shirahige-Tawara Shrine is a Shinto shrine located in Kitsuki City, in Oita Prefecture, Japan. It was ranked as a Gosha shrine. Known for its Doburoku festival.

== Deities ==
- Amatsuhitakahikoho no Mikoto
- Sarutahiko Ōkami
- Amen-Ukemikoto and 51 others.

== Doburoku Festival ==
The Doburoku Festival has continued for more than 1,300 years since 710 (Wado 3), and is held annually on October 17 and 18.。In recent years, many areas have been designated as Doburoku Special Zones where the production of doburoku is allowed, but the shrine was the only one in Kyushu to be authorized by the National Tax Agency before the special zone for structural reform (special zone) began.

The festival consists of a festival on the day before the festival on October 17 and a grand festival on October 18. Doburoku is served on both days, and on the 18th, a mikoshi parade is held. On the 18th, a mikoshi parade is held. In addition, a "Beard Boast Contest" is held in two categories, one for black hair and the other for beards, named after the shrine.

The series of events that began on September 25 and continued until the annual festival on October 18 were selected as Kunitoh no toya event by the government on December 20, 1984 (Showa 59) as an Intangible folk cultural property for which measures such as record making should be taken. It was also selected as a Doburoku Festival of Shirahige Shrine by Oita Prefecture on March 23, 1971 as a Selected Intangible Folk Cultural Property.

== Transportation ==
- 20 minutes drive from Oita Airport Road Kitsuki IC.
- During the Doburoku Festival, a temporary bus service is available from JR Kyushu Nippō Main Line Kitsuki Station.
