= Akumochizake =

Type of sake

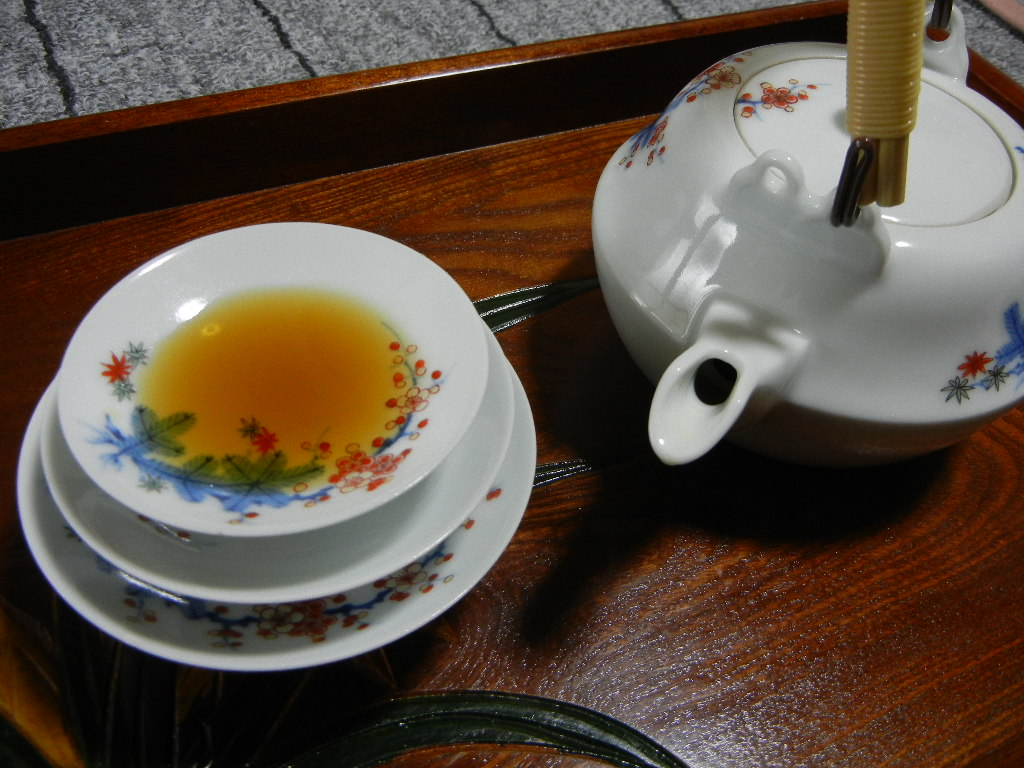
Kumamoto Akazake

Akumochizake (灰持酒) (also written as (灰汁持ち酒)) is a type of sake in which ash is mixed into the brewing mash. It is drunk as a New Year spiced sake.

== See also ==
- Omiki
- Doburoku Matsuri

== Bibliography ==
- 小泉武夫・角田潔和・鈴木昌治『酒学入門』講談社サイエンティフィク 1998年 ISBN 4-06-153714-8
