= Groundbreaking =

Ceremony on the first day of construction

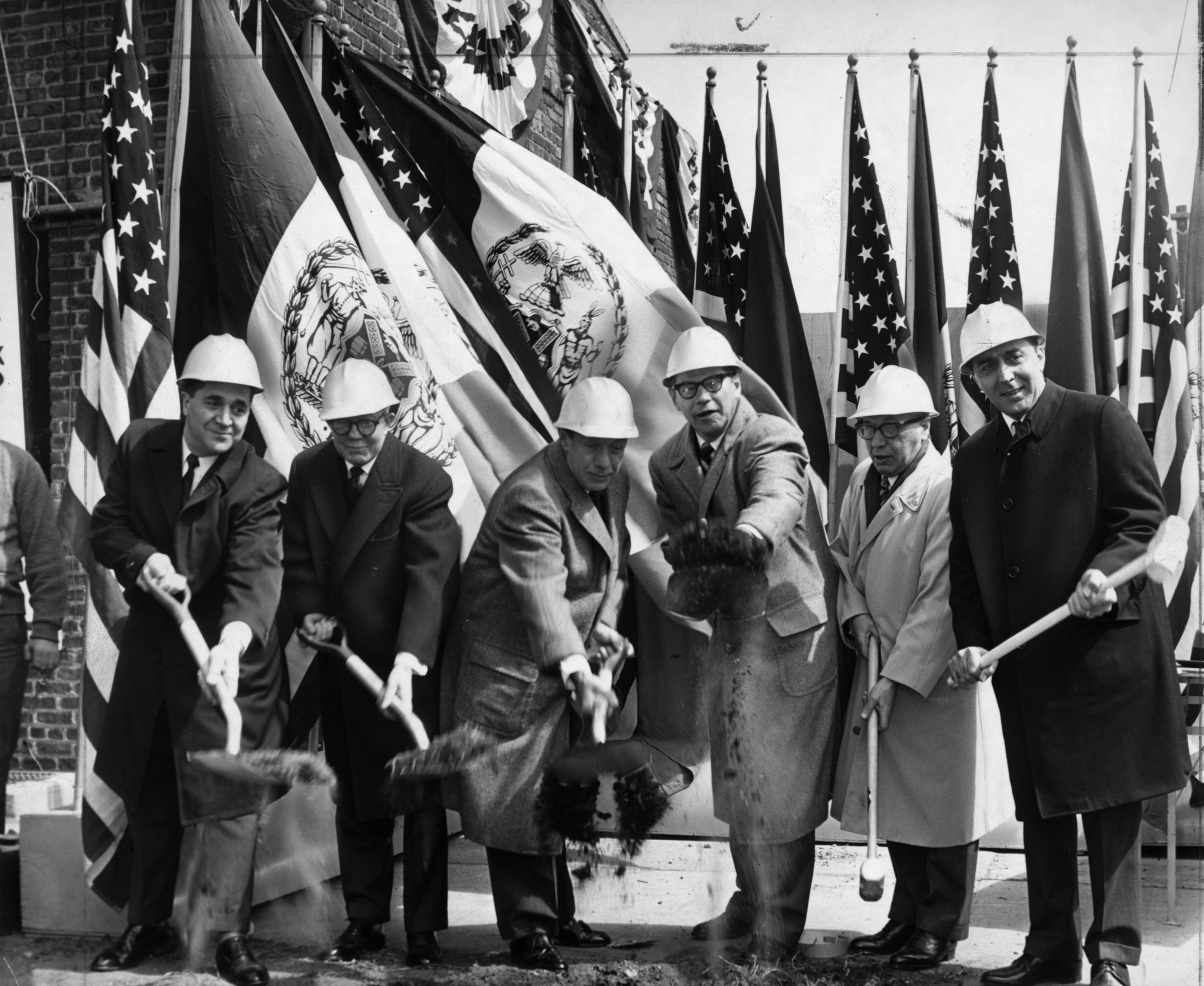
Groundbreaking ceremony for Hunts Point Cooperative Market in New York City, 1962

Groundbreaking, also known as cutting, sod-cutting, turning the first sod, turf-cutting, or a sod-turning ceremony, is a traditional ceremony in many cultures that celebrates the first day of construction for a building or other project. Such ceremonies are often attended by dignitaries such as politicians and business people.

The shovel used during the groundbreaking is often a special ceremonial shovel, sometimes colored gold, meant to be saved for subsequent display and may be engraved. In other groundbreaking ceremonies, a bulldozer is used instead of a shovel to mark the first day of construction. In some groundbreaking ceremonies, the shovel and the bulldozer mark the first day of construction. In other places, this ceremony can be replaced by a "laying of the first stone" event.

== Meaning ==
When used as an adjective, the term groundbreaking may mean being or making something that has never been done, seen, or made before, "stylistically innovative works".

== History ==
Groundbreaking ceremonies have been celebrated for centuries to begin the construction of a property, thanking those who made it possible. Early ceremonies were rooted in religion. Though adapted to modern times, these ceremonies are still important to the construction industry.

Initially, some offerings/refreshments were also used to offer in such ceremonies, including:

- Fruit
- Wine
- Grains
- Incense
- Beans
- Tea leaves
- Sacred items, like holy coins and relics

=== Historical groundbreaking ceremonies ===
The first documented groundbreaking ceremony took place in ancient China, in 113 BC. Later, the tradition of symbolically consecrating the project's location became a part of Hindu, Taoist, Shinto, Buddhist, and Feng Shui traditions. Historically, these are some notable events that were inaugurated by groundbreaking ceremonies.

- The festival for the Washington Monument in 1848 was hosted by President James K. Polk.
- The ceremony for the Parliament House in Melbourne, Australia in 1980 was held for Queen Elizabeth.

== Modern approach to groundbreaking ceremonies ==
The reason for holding groundbreaking ceremonies in modern world has nothing or little to do with religion. Today, the western world exercises this old-age practice with a different purpose.

The celebratory serves as a business activity for building interest in a new project/building. The ceremony generates positive press and regards those who are significant to the development and its overall scope.

Usually, the project developer organizes groundbreaking ceremonies to attract clients and reflect positive impacts on the community, customers/clients, and employees.

Often such ceremonies also incorporate speeches by people of influence, like the founder of the company, a celebrity, or a known politician/member of the community. The sole purpose of such speeches is to showcase how a company is working, growing, meeting its mission, and/or reflecting on its vision, the company's struggles, and future plans.

To create a lasting impression of the company and the ceremony, some common supplies, including shovels, hard hats, etc., are given to participants/attendees.

=== Recent trends ===
Nowadays, real estate companies are trying different approaches to their groundbreaking ceremonies to stand out among their competitors and draw media attention.

Lowe Enterprises, a Los Angeles developer, hosted a "wall raising" in 1997 to draw attention to the start of their building project. Another developer from Santa Monica hosted a "bottoming out" party to mark the completion of their parking garage's lowest level.

A Hollywood developer, TrizecHahn, practiced another unconventional ceremony. The company hosted a costly groundbreaking event for its $350-million Hollywood & Highland entertainment-retail project. The event was served by music producer Quincy Jones and catered by the famed chef Wolfgang Puck.

== Gallery ==
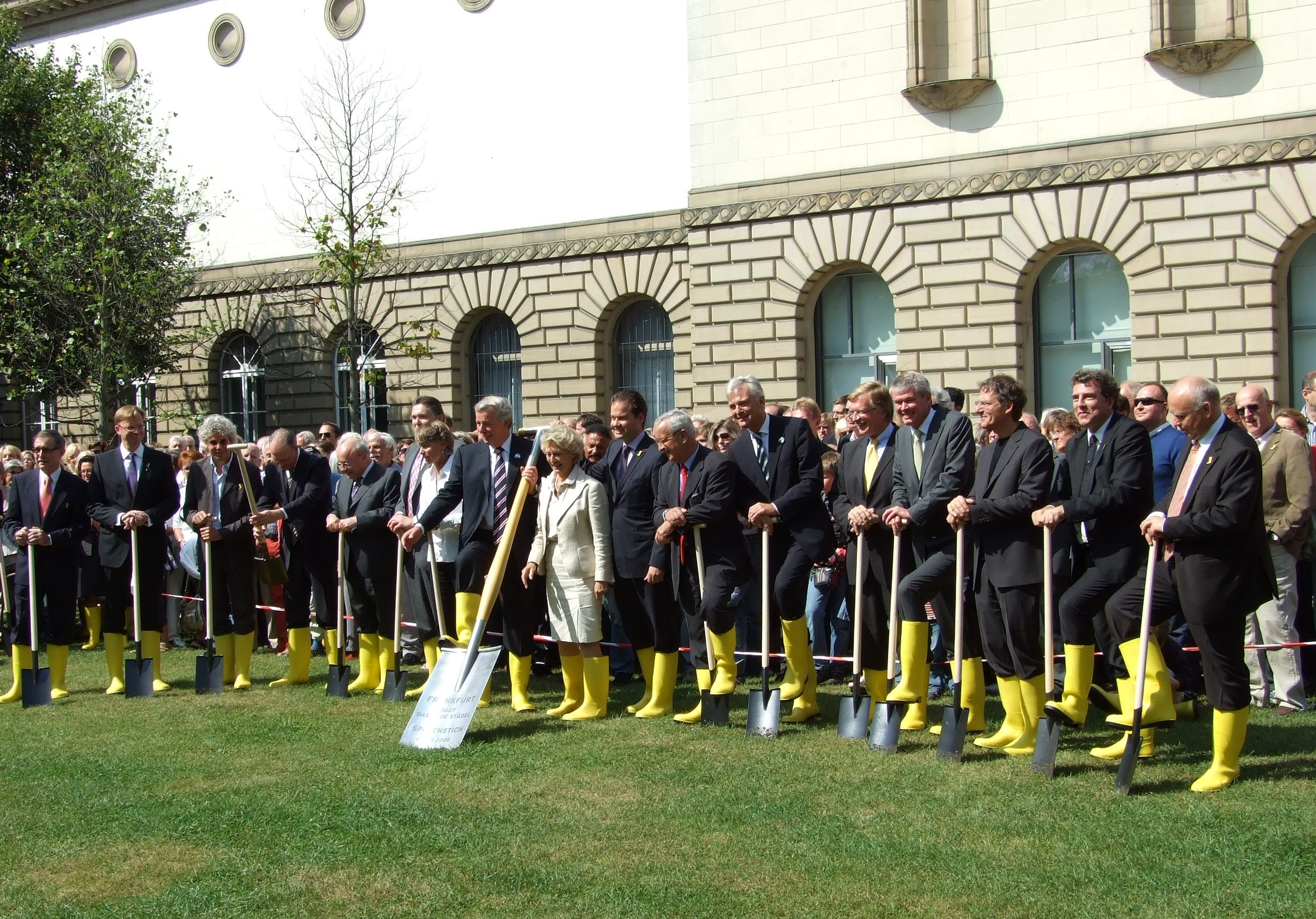
Groundbreaking ceremony with shovels, marking the start of construction of the new Städel Museum in Frankfurt am Main on September 6, 2009

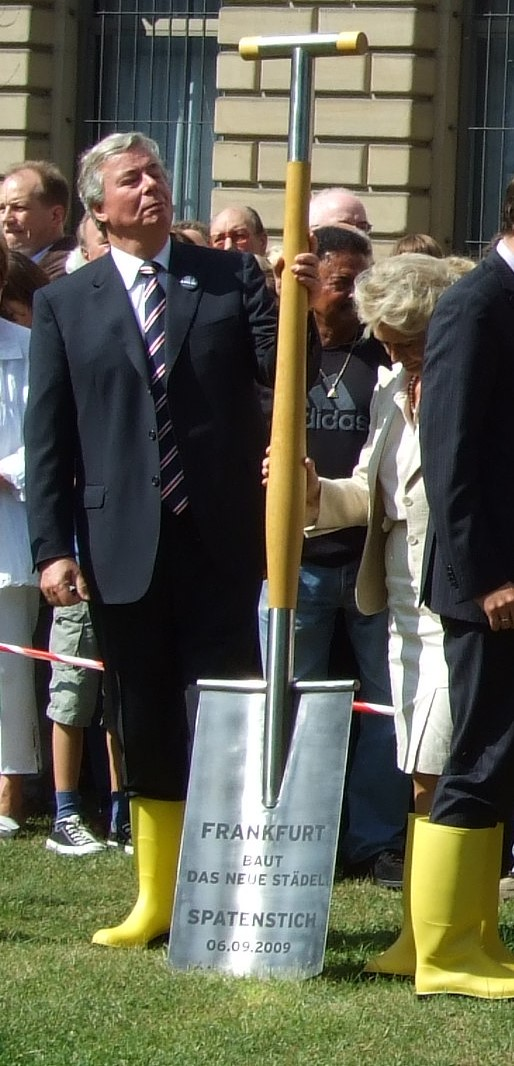
Engraved shovel prepared for the groundbreaking ceremony of the new Städel Museum

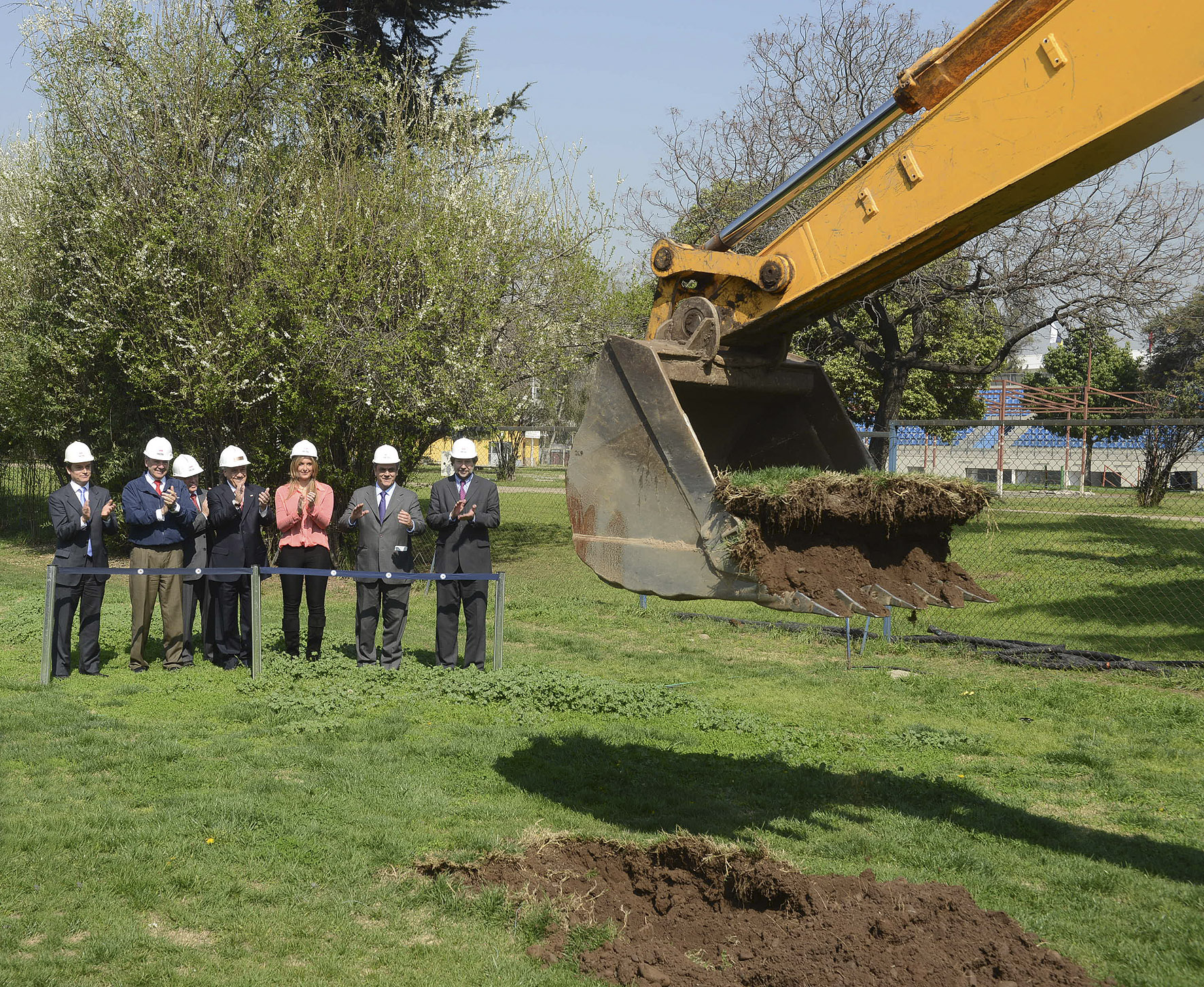
Groundbreaking ceremony with an excavator, marking the start of construction of the new Line 6 of the Santiago Metro on September 13, 2012, in which President Sebastián Piñera (fourth from left) took part

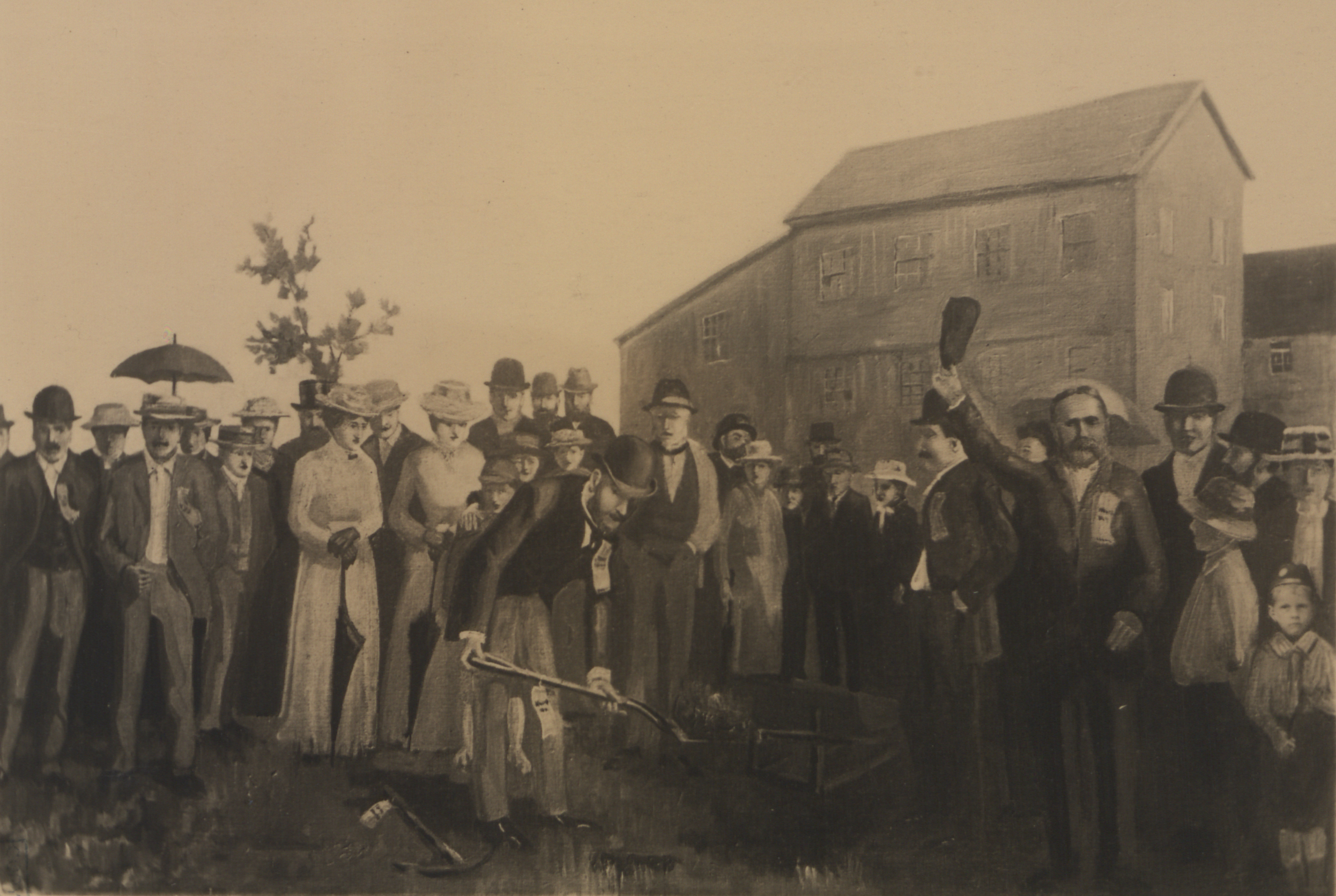
Turning the first sod at Sault Ste-Marie. July 30, 1890, on the first publicly owned power canal constructed in Canada, for the general distribution of power for industrial purposes

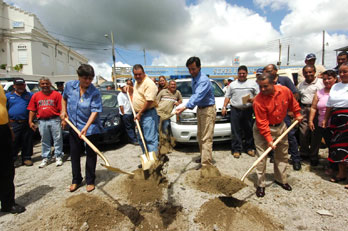
Resident Commissioner Luis Fortuño participates alongside the mayor of Yabucoa, Puerto Rico, Angel García, for the official ceremony of the new construction of the Urban Center and Plaza

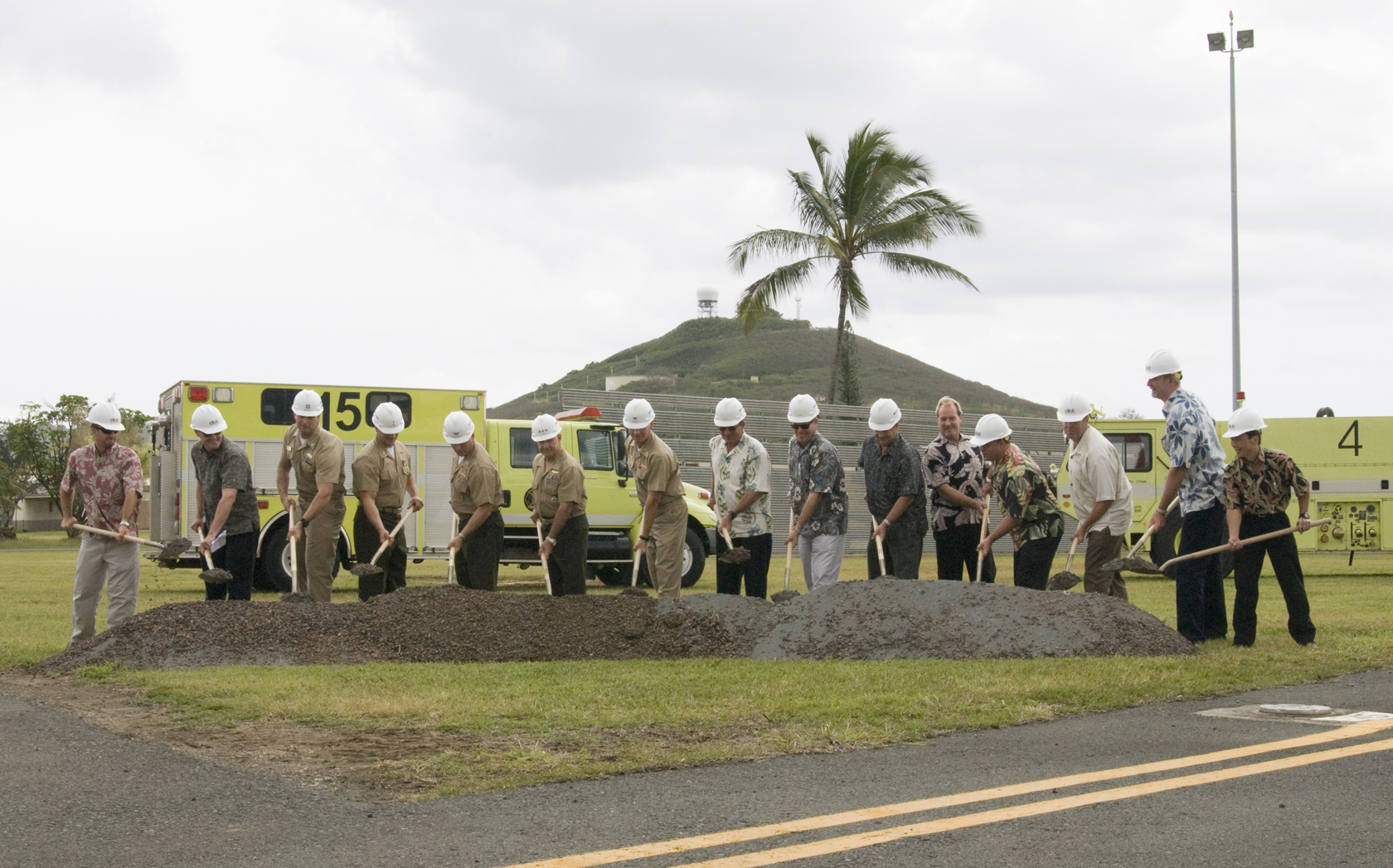
Groundbreaking ceremony for the Marine Corps Air Station Operations Complex on Oahu, Hawaii

== See also ==
- Builders' rites
- Jichinsai - In Japan cace.
- Topping out
- Publicity stunt
- Ribbon cutting ceremony
