= Sikhye =

Korean rice-malt drink

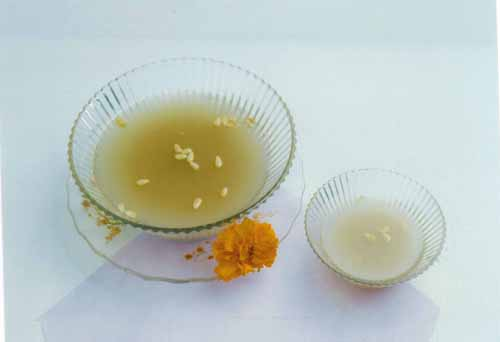
- Sikhye served in a bowl

Korean name
- Hangul: 식혜
- Hanja: 食醯
- RR: sikhye
- MR: sikhye

Sikhye (Korean: 식혜, also spelled shikhye or shikeh; also occasionally termed dansul or gamju) is a traditional sweet Korean rice beverage, usually served as a dessert. It is a popular beverage in South Korea, often found in the beverage sections of convenience stores. It is a drink made by fermenting rice with malt to give it a sweet taste. In addition to its liquid ingredients, sikhye contains grains of cooked rice and in some cases pine nuts. It is similar to the Chinese jiuniang and Japanese amazake.

== Preparation ==
Sikhye is made by pouring malt water onto cooked rice. The malt water steeps in the rice at typically 62 degrees Celsius until grains of rice appear on the surface. The liquid is filtered and boiled until it gets sweet enough (no sugar is added to this drink).

In South Korea and in overseas Korean grocery stores, sikhye is readily available in cans or plastic bottles. One of the largest South Korean producers of sikhye is the Vilac company of Busan. Most canned sikhye typically have a residue of cooked rice at the bottom. Homemade sikhye is often served after a meal in a Korean restaurant.

The method of making sikhye is to first measure the malt properly, put the skin in warm water, wash it, strain it through a fine sieve, and then let the water settle. Grow it in the ground and water it occasionally.

== Regional variations ==
There are several regional variations of sikhye. These include Andong sikhye and yeonyeop sikhye or yeonyeopju, a variety of sikhye made in Gangwon province. Andong sikhye differs in that it includes radishes, carrots, and powdered red pepper. Also, it is fermented for several days as opposed to being boiled. The crunchy texture of the radish is kept despite the longer fermentation process; a soft texture would indicate an inferior product. Whereas the sweet canned or restaurant sikhye is enjoyed as a dessert beverage, Andong sikhye is appreciated as a digestive aid, containing lactobacillus.

== Names ==
Sikhye is also referred to by the names dansul (단술) and gamju (감주; 甘酒). Both of these names mean "sweet wine" and are also used to refer to a sweet, slightly alcoholic rice wine.

=== Hobak-sikhye ===
Hobak-sikhye (pumpkin sikhye) is a water-boiled broth with pumpkin, steamed rice, and malt. It is fermented for several days at a proper temperature. Some sugar is added to taste sweet.

=== Andong sikhye ===
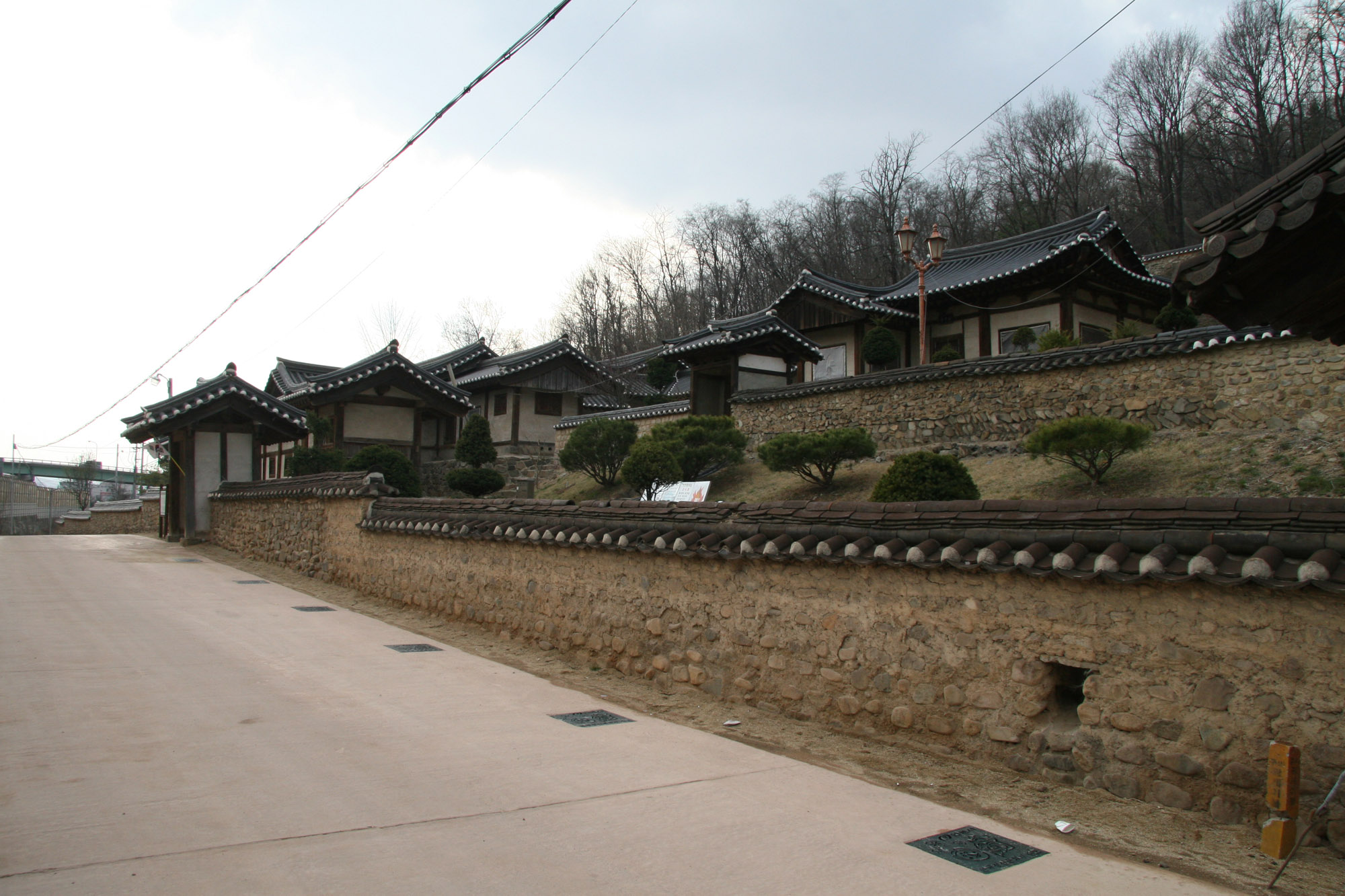
Andong, South Korea

It is original sikhye in Andong, South Korea. It is a little bit different from other Sikhyes. This Sikhye's color is light red with red pepper added.

Though also made with rice, it is left to ferment naturally rather than rushed through the process using the boiling method. Sikhye, especially the type enjoyed in this city but also the most common variety, is high in probiotic bacteria.

=== Yeonyeop-sikhye ===
Yeonyeop-sikhye is made by wrapping the hot glutinous rice, sake, and honey in a lotus leaf. Before drinking, put up a few pieces of pine nuts.

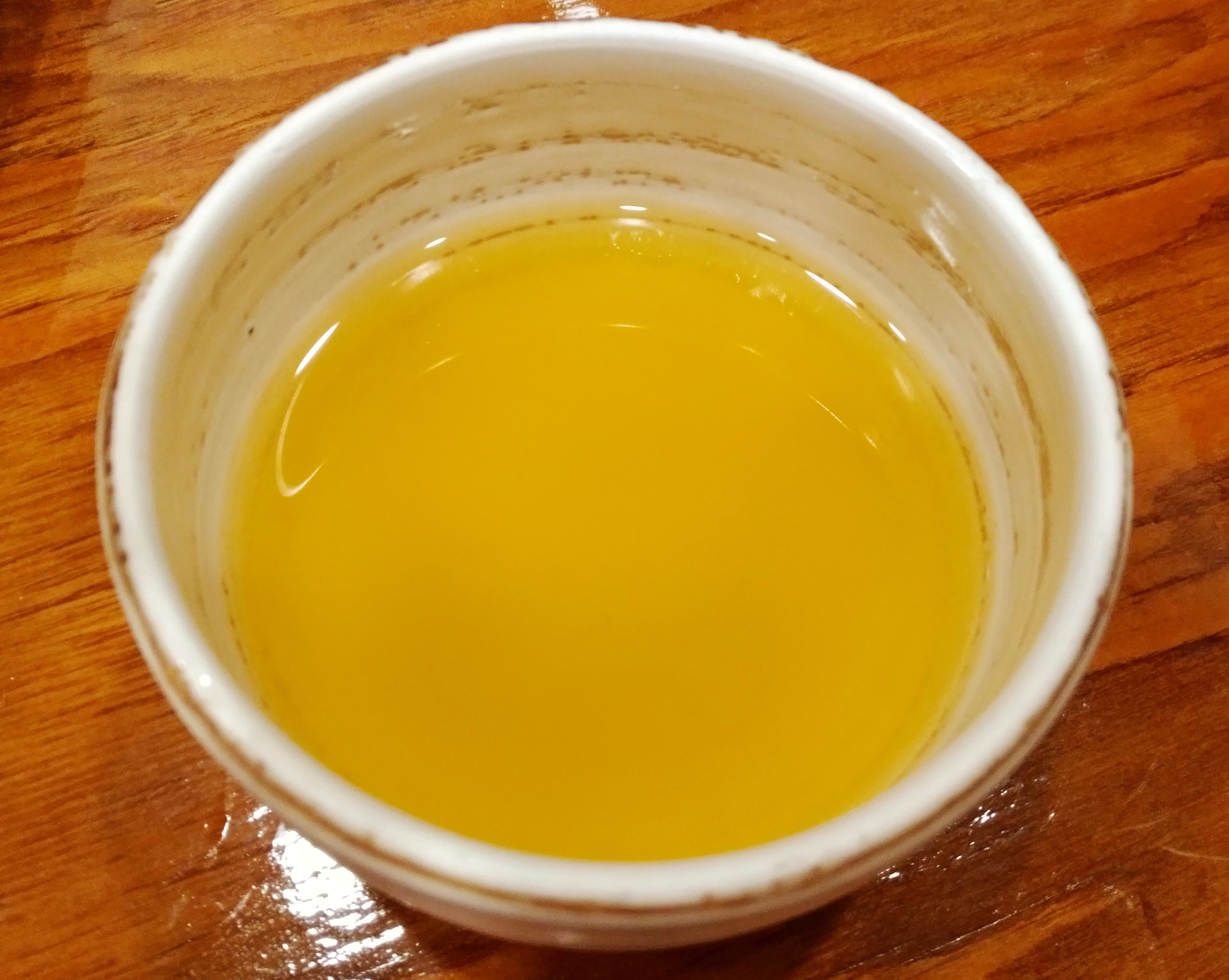
Hobak Sikhye

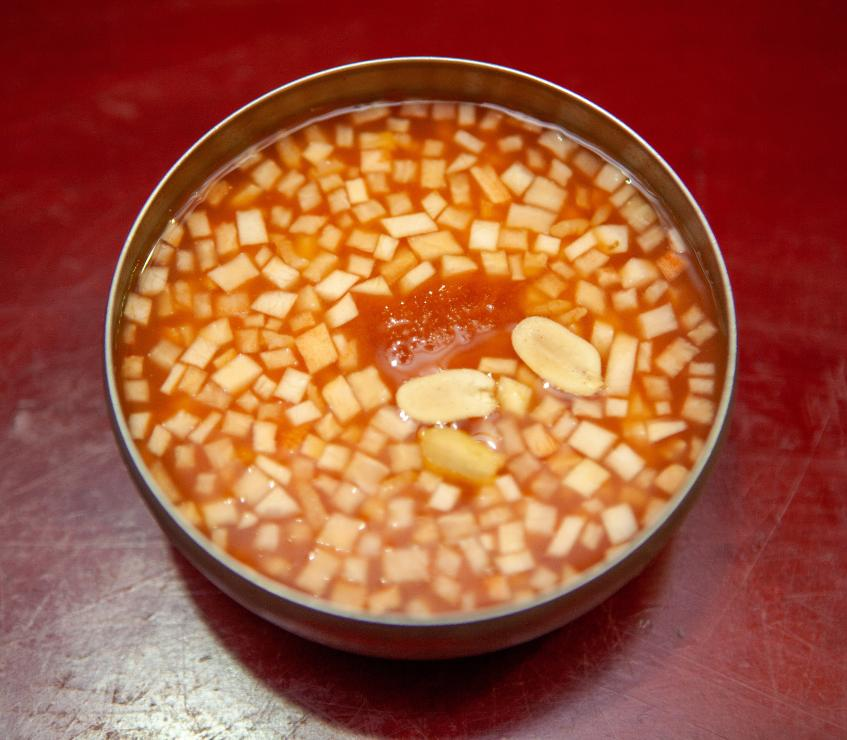
Andong Sikhye

== Effects ==
Sikhye is believed to aid digestion, as it contains dietary fiber and anti-oxidants. It was regularly served to royalty after meals to help digestion.

Sikhye is said to help people who have a "cold" constitution to be warm and also helps those who have too "warm" constitution to be less warm. It is also believed to be very helpful for relieving hangovers.

== Origin of the word ==
Sikhye is a word that does not exist in China or Japan, but rather a Korean word similar to "shikhye" with similar pronunciation and meaning. Sik (or Sak) is related with mature and Hye is making alcohol or sweet juice. These two words were combined to form. However, there is not yet a solid literary basis for etymology.

== Preparation ==
Barley is sprouted in water, then ground, filtered, and fermented. the barley is made into grounded and fermented food

== Gallery ==
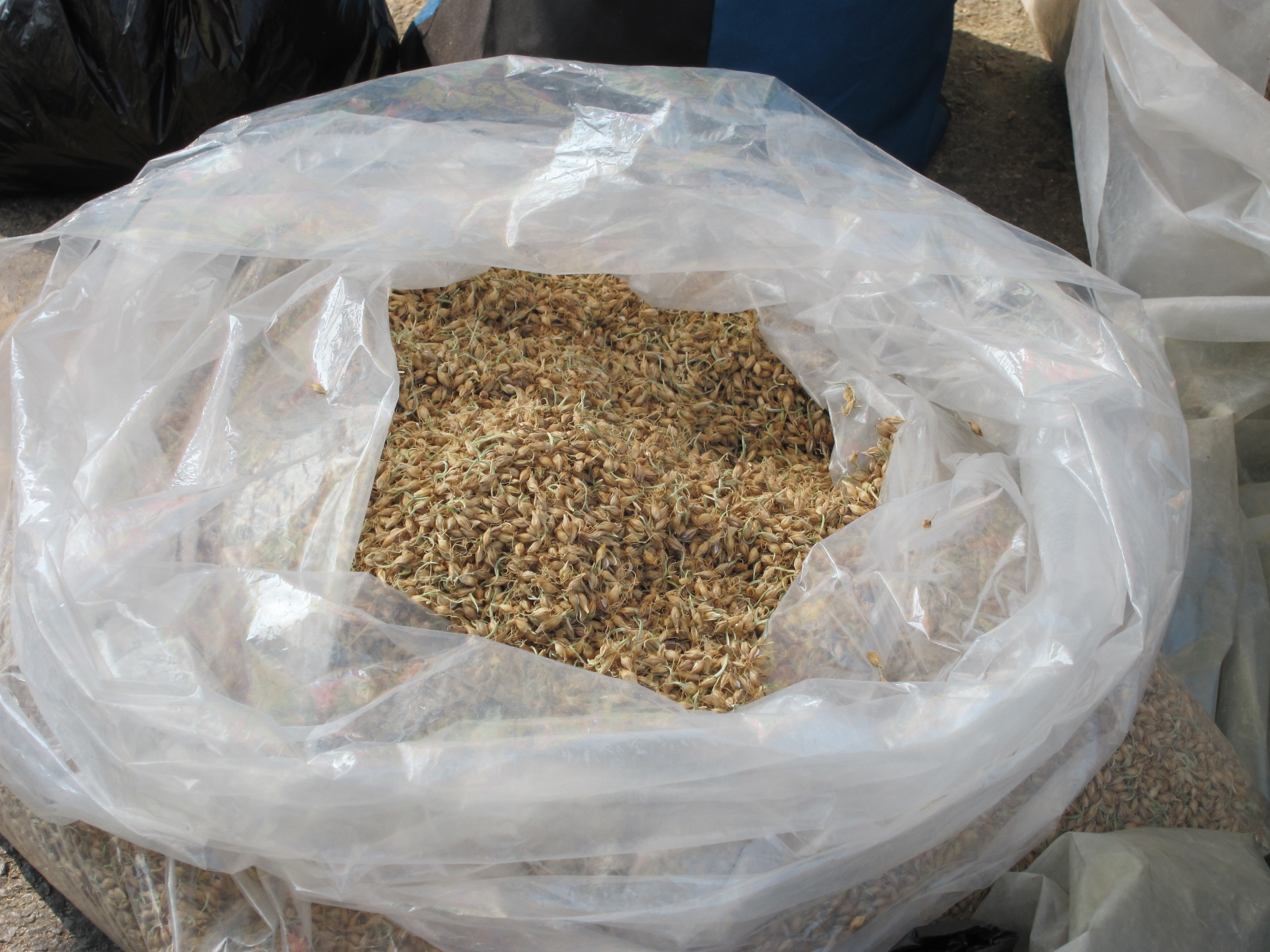
Yeot-gireum (malted barley) used for making sikhye

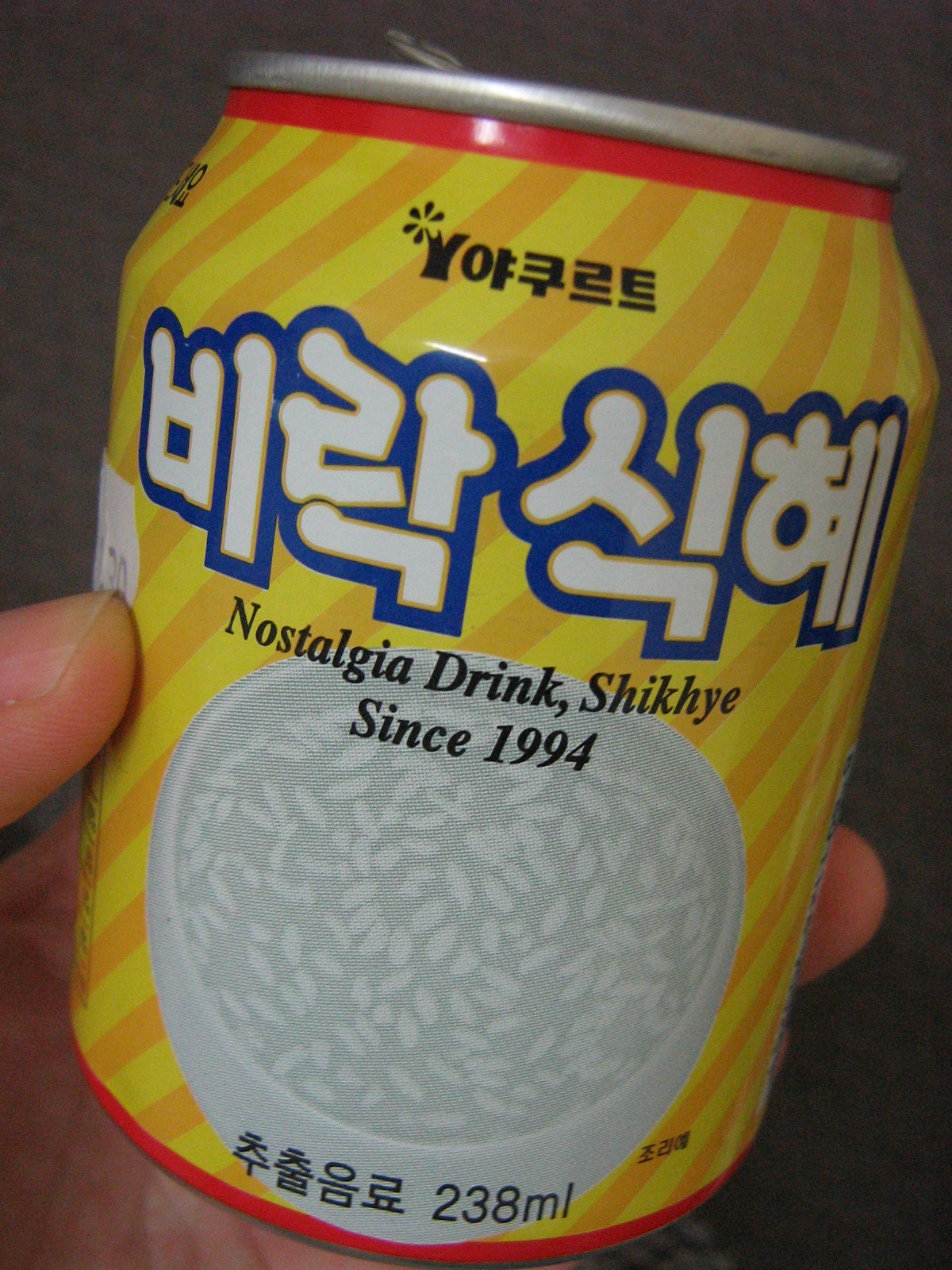
A can of sikhye, produced by Korea Yakult

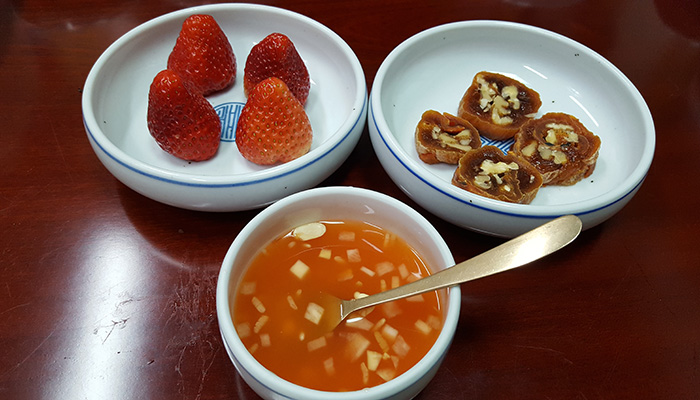
Andong-sikhye with gotgam-mari and strawberries

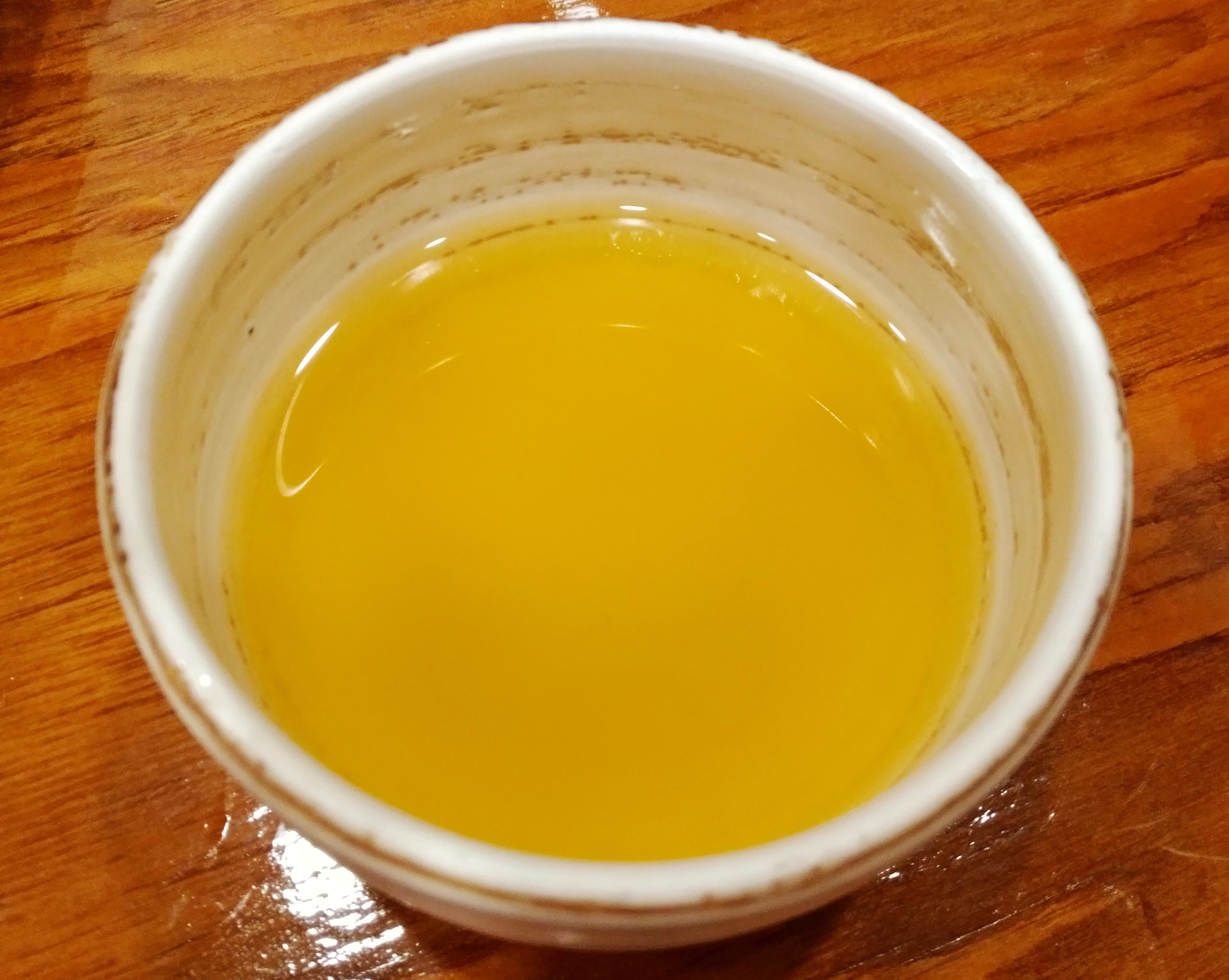
Hobak-sikhye (pumpkin rice punch)

== See also ==
- Gamju
- Korean cuisine
- Korean tea
- Plant milk
- Rice milk
- Sujeonggwa
- Sungnyung
