= Doburoku =

Variety of sake

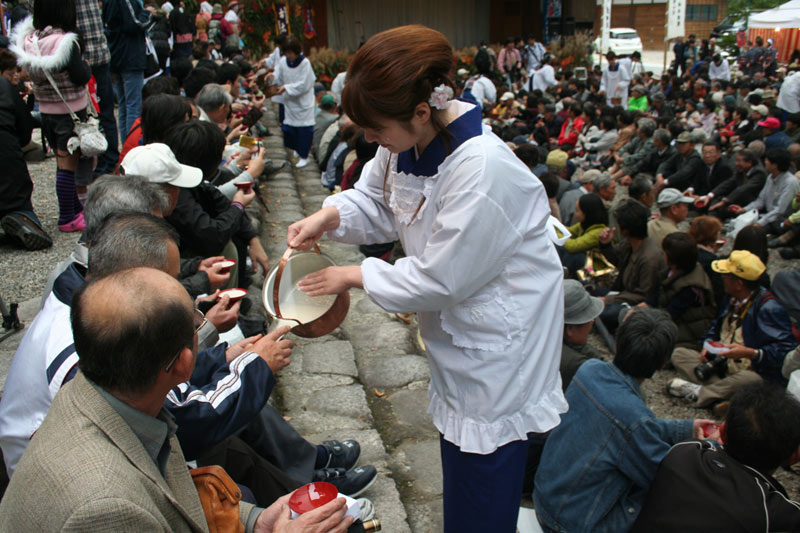
- Doburoku served at the Shirakawa-go Doburoku Festival in Japan
- Type: Rice alcoholic beverage
- Origin: Japan
- Introduced: Ancient Japan
- Alcohol by volume: Variable (commonly 6–15%)
- Colour: Cloudy white
- Flavour: Varies; often mildly sweet to dry
- Ingredients: Rice, rice kōji, water, yeast
- Related products: Sake, Nigori sake, Amazake

Doburoku (どぶろく; 濁酒, literally “cloudy sake”) is a traditional Japanese unfiltered rice alcoholic beverage made from rice, rice kōji, water, and yeast. Unlike modern sake (seishu), doburoku is not pressed or filtered, leaving suspended rice solids in the finished drink. It is regarded as one of the earliest forms of Japanese sake and a precursor to later, clarified brewing styles (e.g., modern seishu).

== Definition and characteristics ==
Doburoku is produced by fermenting steamed rice and rice kōji together with water and yeast. Because the mash (moromi) is not pressed, the beverage remains opaque and viscous, with a milky appearance and variable texture. Flavor profiles range from mildly sweet to dry or acidic depending on fermentation practices, rice variety, and local tradition.

Doburoku should be distinguished from nigori sake, which is filtered through a coarse mesh and legally classified as a type of seishu. In contrast, true doburoku omits the pressing step entirely and retains a much higher proportion of rice solids.

== Etymology ==
The term doburoku is written with the characters 濁 (“cloudy, turbid”) and 酒 (“alcohol, sake”). The word historically referred broadly to unrefined or roughly brewed alcoholic drinks, though in modern usage it generally denotes unfiltered rice sake.

== History ==
Doburoku has been brewed in Japan since antiquity, closely associated with early wet-rice agriculture and household- or village-level fermentation practices. Prior to the development of specialized brewing technology and legal regulation, unfiltered sake styles similar to doburoku were widespread.

From the early modern period onward, improvements in pressing techniques and the institutionalization of sake brewing led to the dominance of clear, filtered sake. Doburoku gradually declined in everyday production but persisted in local contexts, particularly in rural areas and in connection with religious observances.

== Legal status in Japan ==
Under Japan's Liquor Tax Law (酒税法), the manufacture of alcoholic beverages with an alcohol content of 1% or higher requires a liquor manufacturing license issued by local tax offices under the authority of the National Tax Agency. Doburoku falls within this regulatory framework, and while home brewing was historically common it is now illegal in Japan without a license. Further, unlicensed production is illegal regardless of whether the beverage is sold or consumed privately.

== Doburoku Special Zones ==
In the early 2000s, Japan introduced Doburoku Special Zones (どぶろく特区) under the Structural Reform Special Zone system. These zones relax minimum annual production requirements for liquor manufacturing licenses while maintaining tax obligations and regulatory oversight. The system enables small-scale, locally oriented doburoku production, particularly in rural or agricultural regions, but does not exempt producers from licensing requirements.

== Religious production ==
Certain Shinto shrines are permitted to brew doburoku for ritual purposes, especially in connection with agricultural festivals. Such production is limited in scope, subject to administrative oversight, and distinct from commercial manufacture.

Under Japan's Liquor Tax Law (酒税法), the manufacture of alcoholic beverages with an alcohol content exceeding 1% requires a liquor manufacturing license issued by local tax offices under the authority of the National Tax Agency. Doburoku falls under this regulatory framework, and unlicensed production is generally illegal regardless of whether the beverage is sold or consumed privately.

Historically, standard licensing requirements included minimum annual production volumes that effectively excluded small-scale producers.

== Cultural significance ==
Doburoku is closely associated with Shinto ritual and agrarian culture. It is commonly offered to deities (kami) during festivals praying for abundant harvests and communal well-being. Some shrines host Doburoku Festivals (Doburoku Matsuri), where shrine-brewed doburoku is consumed as part of ceremonial observance.

== Production process ==
Doburoku is made by fermenting steamed rice with rice kōji, water, and yeast, and is served without pressing or filtration.

- Rice is washed, soaked, and steamed.
- A portion of the rice is prepared as kōji (rice inoculated with kōji mold) to convert starches to fermentable sugars.
- Steamed rice, kōji, water, and yeast are combined in a fermentation vessel.
- Saccharification and alcoholic fermentation proceed in parallel in the fermenting mash (moromi).
- The fermented mash is not pressed; the product is bottled or served as-is, retaining suspended rice solids and a cloudy appearance.

In contrast, nigori-zake is a type of seishu that is pressed and then passed through a coarse mesh, whereas doburoku omits pressing and remains essentially unstrained moromi.

== See also ==
- Sake
- Nigori
- Amazake
- Kuchikami-zake
