= Amazake =

Japanese drink made from fermented rice

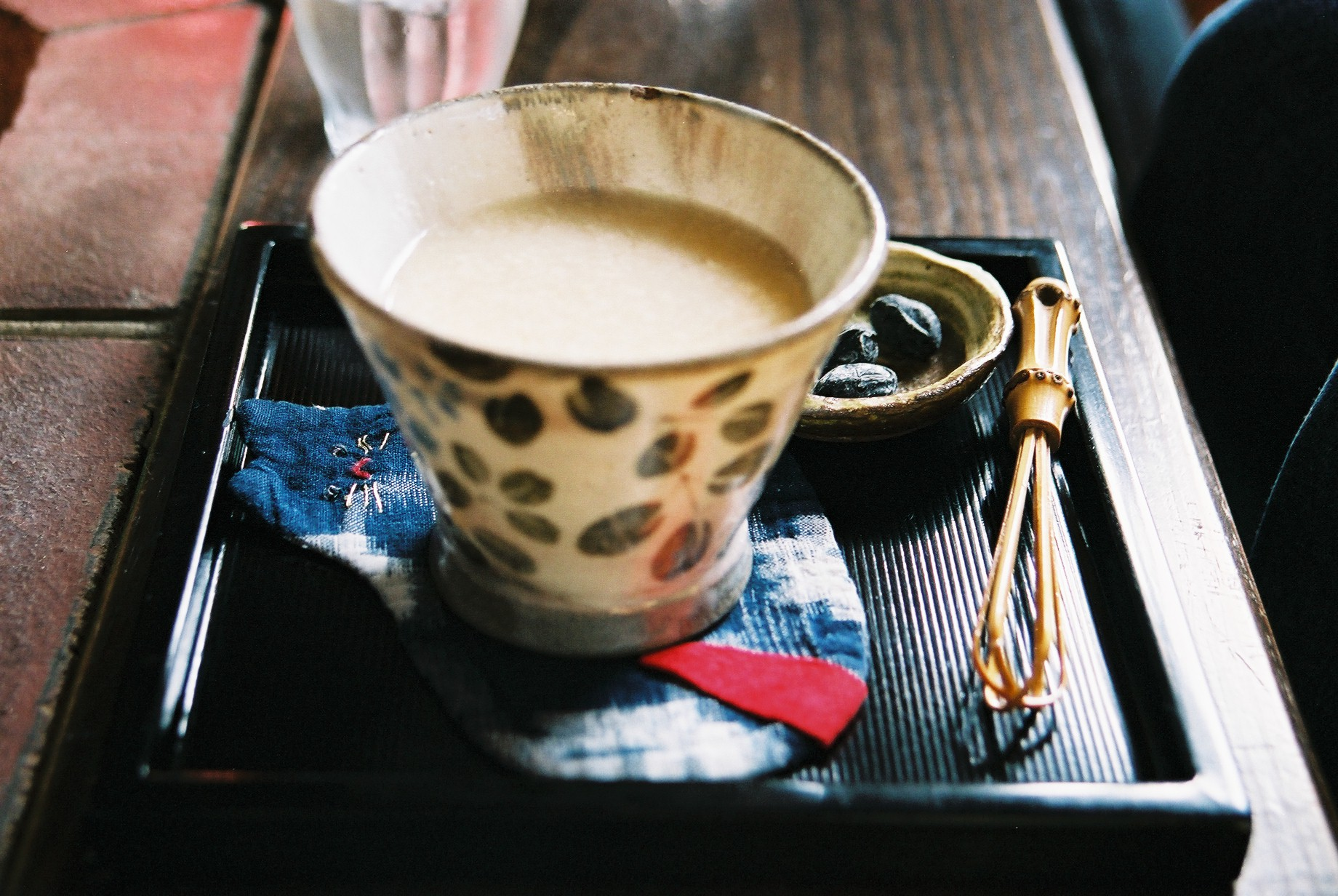
- A cup of amazake
- Type: Plant milk
- Course: Drink
- Place of origin: Japan
- Region or state: East Asia
- Associated cuisine: Japanese cuisine
- Created by: Kofun period in Japan
- Serving temperature: Warm, room temperature, or cold
- Main ingredients: Fermented rice

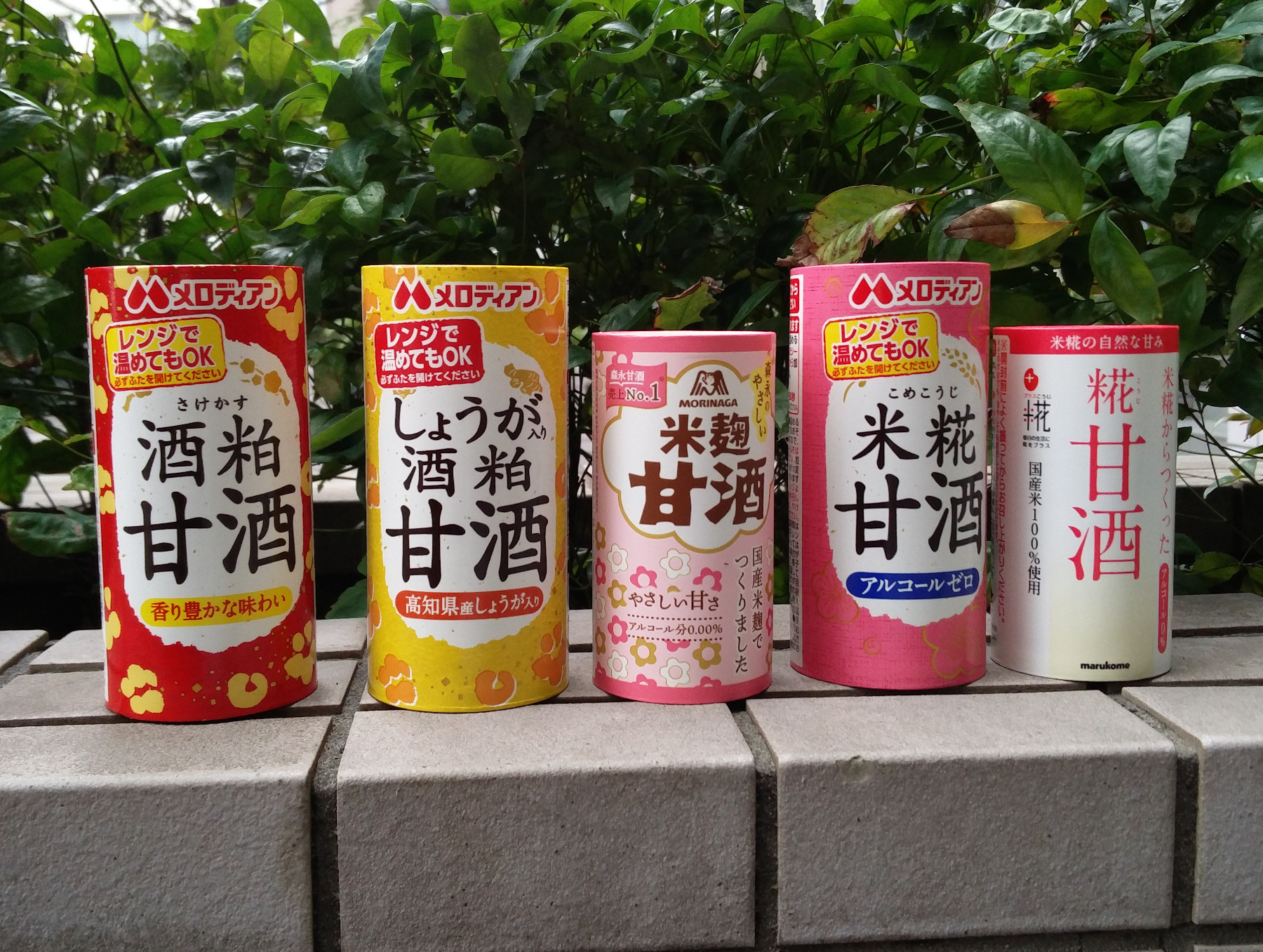
Several types of amazake from a supermarket

Amazake (甘酒; Japanese pronunciation: [ä̀mä́(d͡)zä́ké̞]) is a traditional sweet, low-alcohol or non-alcoholic Japanese drink made from fermented rice. Amazake dates from the Kofun period, and it is mentioned in the Nihon Shoki. It is part of the family of traditional Japanese foods made using the koji mold Aspergillus oryzae (麹, kōji), which also includes miso, soy sauce, and sake.

There are several recipes for amazake that have been used for hundreds of years. By a popular recipe, kōji is added to cooled whole grain rice causing enzymes to break down the carbohydrates into simpler unrefined sugars. As the mixture incubates, sweetness develops naturally. By another recipe, sake kasu is mixed with water and sugar is added.

Amazake can be used as a dessert, snack, natural sweetening agent, salad dressing, or smoothie. One traditional amazake drink, prepared by combining amazake and water, heated to a simmer, and often topped with a pinch of finely grated ginger, was popular with street vendors, and it is still served at inns, teahouses, and at festivals. Many Shinto shrines and Buddhist temples provide or sell it in the New Year. In the 20th century, an instant version became available.

Amazake contains many nutrients, including vitamin B1, B2, B6, folic acid, dietary fiber, oligosaccharide, cysteine, arginine and glutamine. It is often considered a hangover cure in Japan. Outside Japan, it is often sold in Asian grocery stores during the winter months, and, all year round, in natural food stores in the U.S. and Europe, as a beverage and natural sweetener.

Similar beverages include the Chinese jiuniang which is more pudding like and Korean gamju or sikhye. In grape winemaking, must – sweet, thick, unfermented grape juice – is a similar product.

== See also ==
- Akumochizake – Type of sake
- Brown rice syrup – Sweetener derived from rice
- Choujiu
- Fermented drinks and beverages
- Gamju – Korean equivalent of Amazake
- Sikhye – Korean equivalent of Amazake
- Jiuniang – Chinese equivalent of Amazake
- Must – similar product in winemaking
- Rice milk – Plant milk made from rice
- Rice pudding – Dish made from rice mixed with water or milk
- Small beer – Beer variety, with low alcohol content
