= Shinsen =

Offerings of foods given up to Shinto shrines or kamidana in Japan

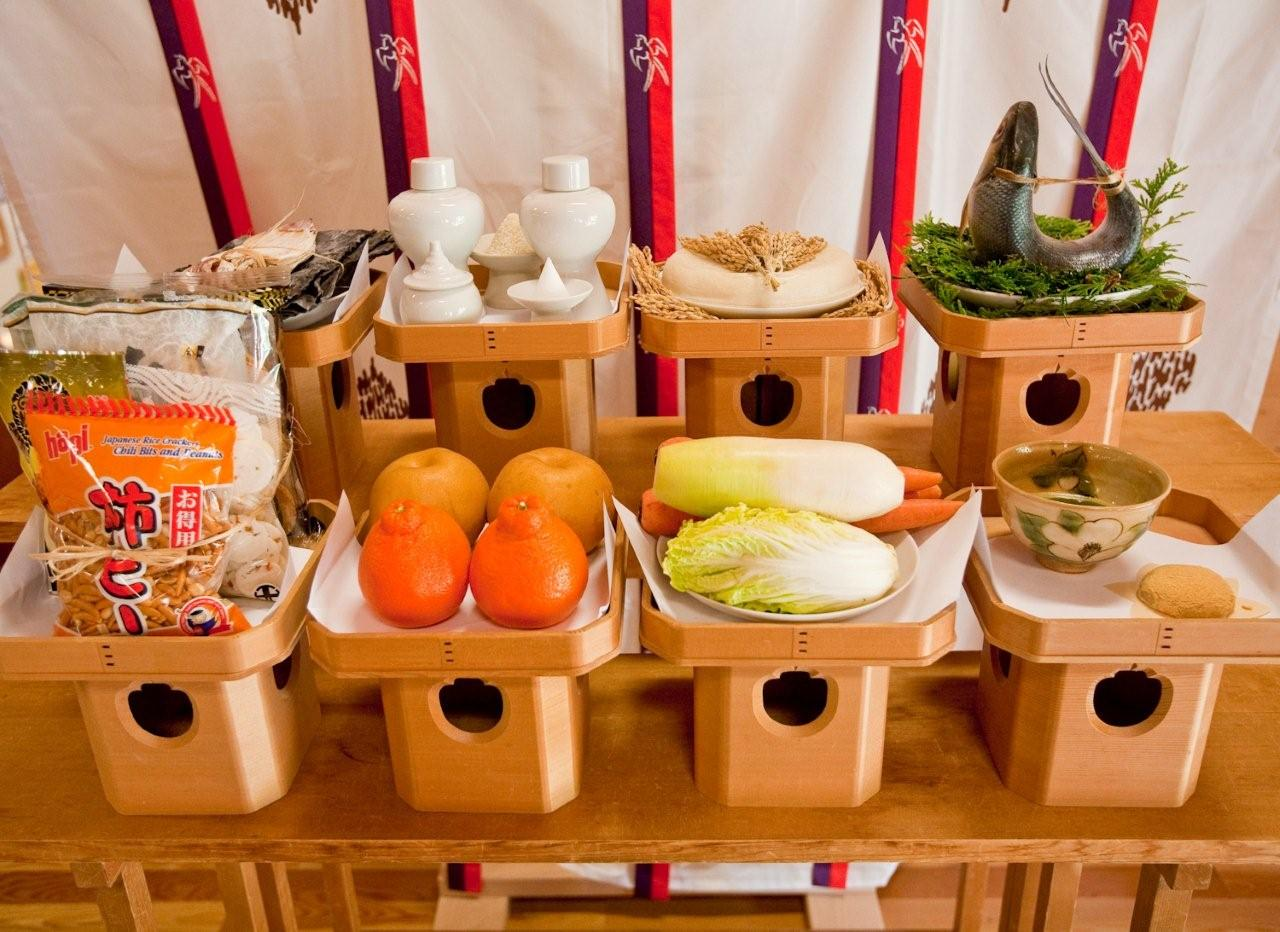
Shinto Shinsen

Shinsen (神饌, literally "god" + "food offering") are offerings of foods given up to Shinto shrines or kamidana in Japan.

The annual festivals carried out at different times of the year originated from Shinto rituals and festivals. As part of the ritual, locals would offer up food that had received a special blessing to welcome the kami ("gods" or "spirits").

Food offered up could range from their staple of rice to seafood, food foraged from the mountains, seasonal foods, local specialties, or food connected to the enshrined kami. At the end of the ritual, the offered food is eaten together to gain a sense of unity with the kami, and to gain their blessing and protection. The rite is known as naorai.

== Process ==
=== Preparation ===
There are shrines that have buildings dedicated to preparing shinsen, but for the shrines that do not, they separate their shrine office from the outside using a shimenawa, and then priests or ujiko, someone who worships an ujigami, who have purified themselves by abstaining from meat prepare the offerings. A purifying fire known as imibi is used, and to ensure no saliva or breath touches the shinsen, it is common for the priests to cover their mouths with paper. Such care is put into the preparation of the shinsen that even those whose relatives have recently been met with illness or death are not allowed to take part. Before the Meiji era, the imperial court would send out their chief steward to festivals held on imperial grounds such as the Kasuga Festival held at the Kasuga Grand Shrine to prepare the offerings. Upon Emperor Meiji's orders to revive the traditional ceremonies, the shinsen offered up returned to the unique kind given at festivals tied to the imperial family, but their preparation was carried out by regular Shinto priests.

=== Offerings ===
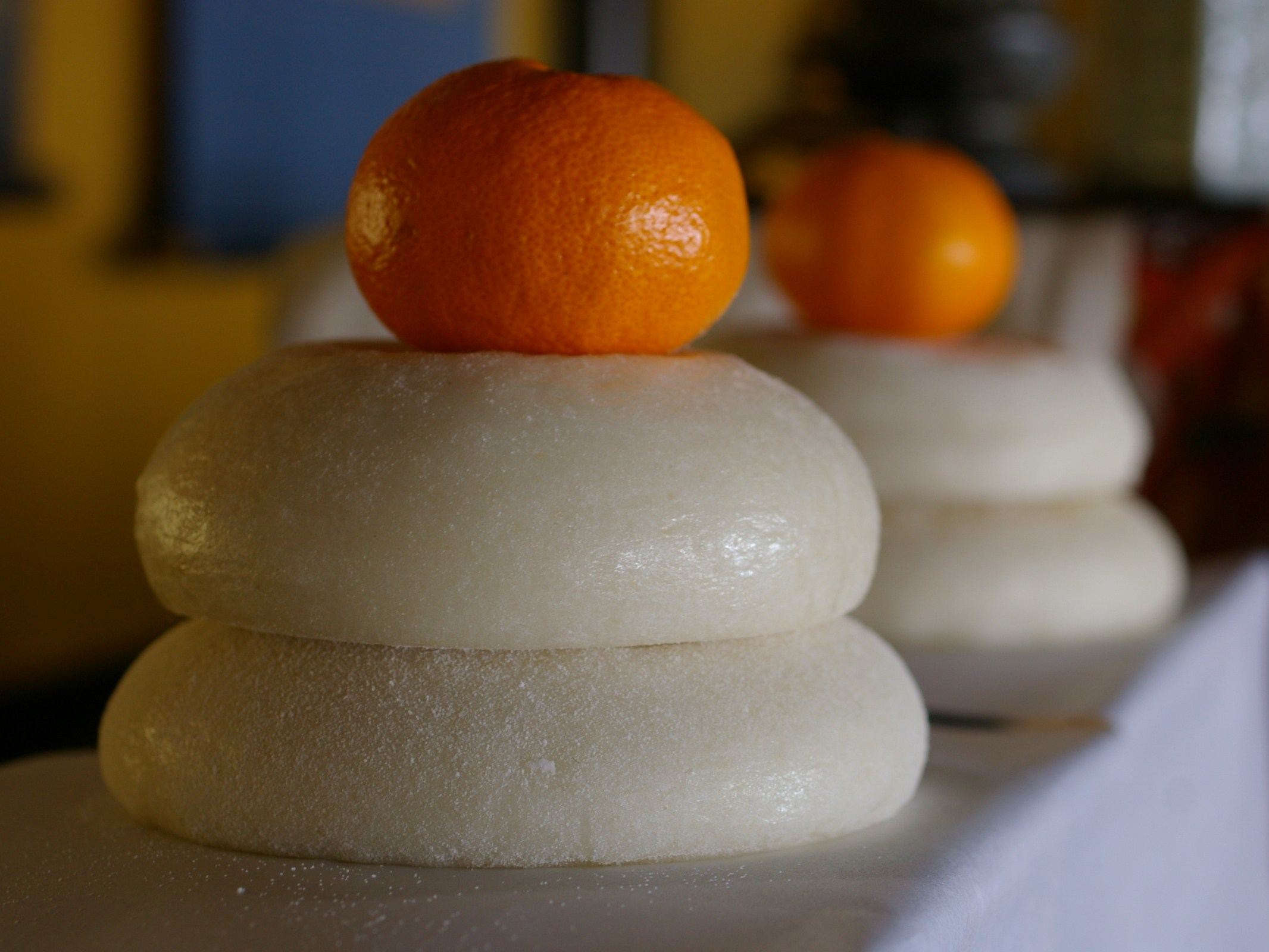
Kagami mochi, a common food offering.

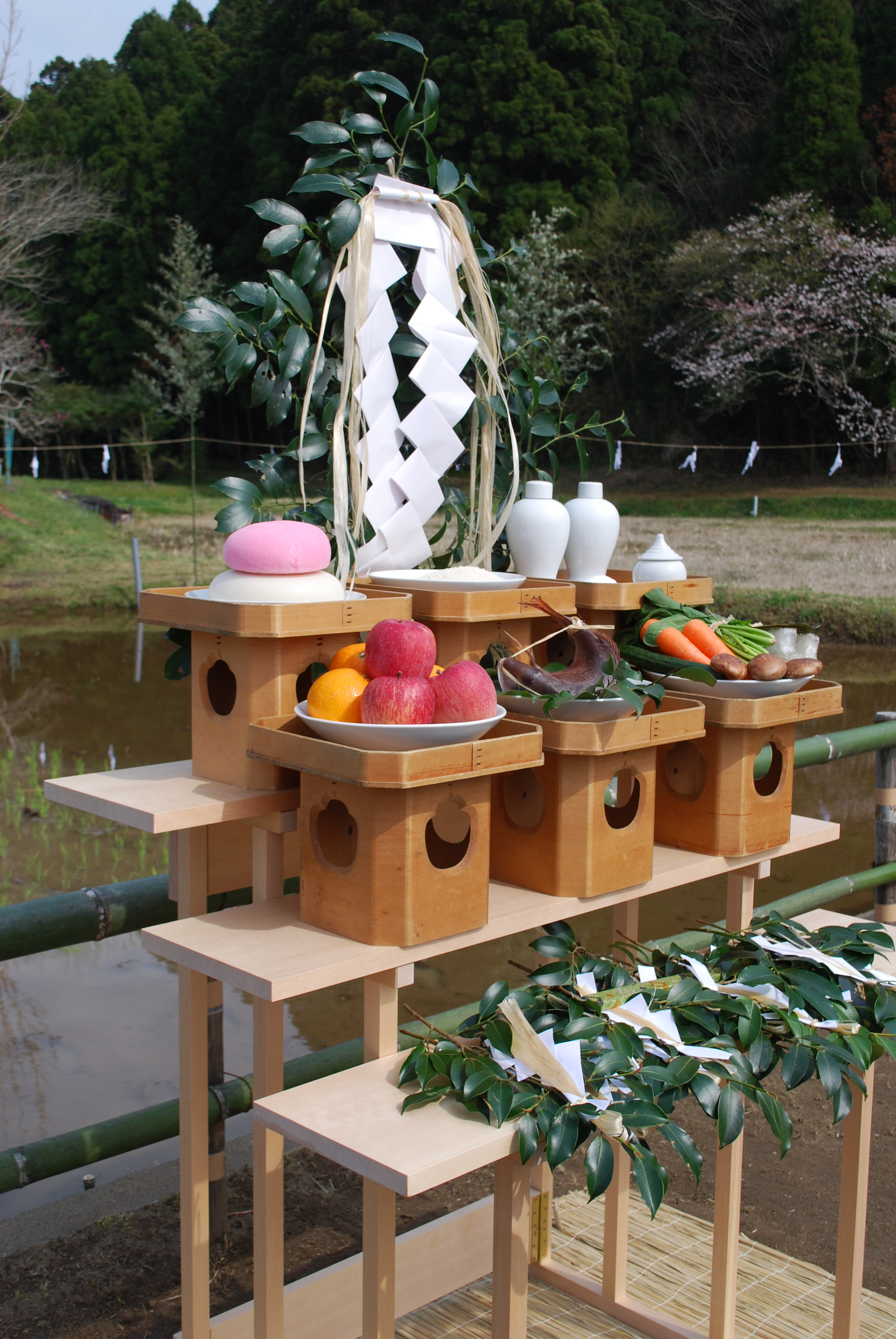
A shrine offering at Katori Shrine's Otaue Rice Planting Festival.

As there is an underlying concept of doing all one can with sincerity, there are many changes in the contents of the shinsen depending on season or region. There are regions where the custom of offering up the first produce of the year before an altar without eating it remains, but there are also areas where offerings are selected from amongst the seasonal foods.

==== Grains ====
Ever since Japan learned how to cultivate rice, spring being the season to plow the fields and autumn being the season to harvest the crops has become the foundation of Japanese society. It is believed that the kami of food and agriculture, Ukanomitama, resides within the rice, and so rice is deeply connected to their way of life. It is for this reason that food or drink made from rice such as mochi or sake in the form of omiki are a staple offering, so much so that there is even a saying that says, "There is no kami without sake." However, as the ritual does not have a specific form, the specific offerings are not standardized, either.

==== Specialty foods ====
Aside from grains, it is also common for seafood and vegetables to be offered up, and there are some shrines that offer up fowl. However, it is rare for animal meat to be offered up as shinsen. The Engishiki lists many specific offerings other than sacred sake, such as various kinds of mochi, and also contains records of how to prepare dishes like simmered bonito, sweetfish boiled in brine, and crucian carp simmered in hishio.

Although many shrines desire shinsen made up only of vegetables that do not emit a strong smell, a Buddhist diet known as kinkunshoku, there are shrines that do not go by this. For example, garlic is offered up at Kamigamo Shrine, and animal meat is offered up at Shiromi Shrine, where a rite known as onie is carried out in which the head of a boar that had been hunted that year is offered up. Shrines where people are honoured, such as those who died in the war, it is common to offer up beer, cigarettes or other such off-the-shelf items, which is also considered shinsen.

Local specialties or items tied to traditions are often given up as shinsen. That has continued to the present day, and many have remained in the form of a region's characteristic Shinto rituals. For example, Nara Prefecture's burdock ritual, Shimane Prefecture's eggplant ritual, Shiga Prefecture's cucumber festival, Kyoto's wasabi festival, and Tokyo's sumomo plum festival.

Other than food symbolising a ripe harvest, there are shrines such as Mimi Shrine in Mihama, Fukui Prefecture, Suwa Shrine in Nambu, Aomori Prefecture, and Miho Shrine found in Matsue, Shimane Prefecture, where what is offered up is Dioscorea tokoro, a plant that is not regularly eaten in everyday life. There are three different interpretations for why the tokoro is offered up by the three different shrines: it is offered up at Mimi Shrine in thanks for keeping their hunger at bay during famine, Miho Shrine because it was said to be a lucky charm in a book of the Edo period resulting in it being used as a talisman at New Year's, Suwa Shrine because it was traditionally used for its medicinal properties.

==== Tougashi ====
Food prepared with oil is often given up as shinsen. Oil was traditionally made from ingredients such as sesame seeds, kaya or walnuts, but it is said the method of using oil to fry foods came from China, leading to them being called tougashi, or Chinese sweets. Sweets called heso-dango, named as such because they look like a belly button (heso), are offered up at Kobe's Ikuta Shrine. They are made by beating rice into rice flour, rolling them into balls, and then pressing a finger through the middle of it. When these are made into a semi-circular shape like gyoza dumplings instead, they are called buto. When it is laced together in a way that looks like an 8, it is called magarimochi. When it is cylinder-shaped, it is called baishi, though it was originally made by splitting it into a Y-shape.

==== Plants ====
There are also many shrines that offer up plants. For example, Isagawa Shrine in Nara offers up a sake barrel decorated with sasayuri (Lilium japonicum) flowers. This is because the enshrined deity, Himetataraisuzuhime-no-Mikoto, lived on Mount Miwa when she was young. There is a legend that on the bank of the Saigawa River that flows through it, there was an area where those lilies bloomed. Even now, the lilies offered up as shinsen come from Mount Miwa.

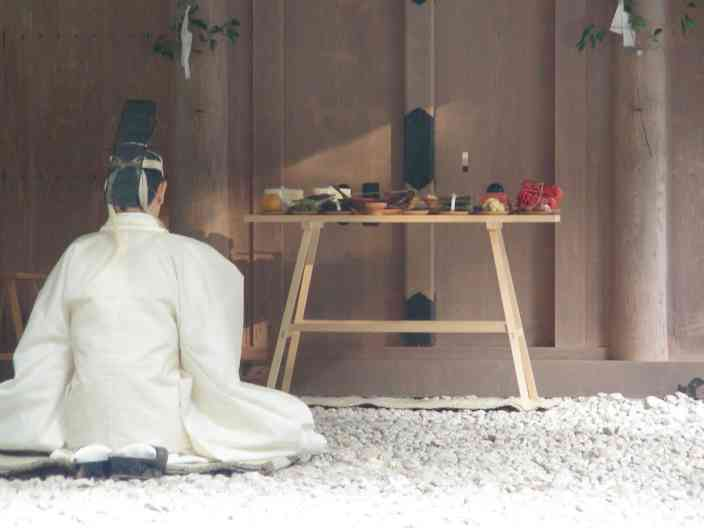
Shinsen offered up to the Yamatohime Shrine at the Niiname-no-Matsuri.

== Passing down the traditions ==
In order to prevent the treatment of shinsen changing from being offerings to the kami to simply being regular mundane items, many of the details tied to the offering up of shinsen are passed down from generation to generation among trusted family members, so as to not mindlessly spread the methods. As a result, any written records left are often personal memos with very few official records left behind. This is also the case with the preparation of shinsen, and so there are many shrines that no longer know why it is tradition to make certain offerings as no written records were left. However, there are also shrines which, upon realising that it would be difficult to pass down certain aspects of the preparation through traditional methods, chose to leave written records. In 1871, the Great Council of State issued a proclamation abolishing the hereditary system of Shinto priests in which each new generation succeeded the last. In an attempt to pass down the information, Katori Shrine noted down the details of the rituals in various documents. Amongst these were details and attached illustrations on how to light an imibi, the required tools, how to use them, how to cut and weave Manchurian wild rice which is used to make the vessels which hold the offerings, how to prepare and dry fish, and how to make purifying smoke.

In areas where an ujiko prepared the shinsen, the methods were passed down by a group known as a miyaza. The family that took the leading role in the miyaza was known as the touya, or the head family, and the central figure of that family was called the tounin. According to records detailing the system, the tounin was required to go through extreme fasting. There are shrines such as Miho Shrine that still retain the strict rules pertaining to this. For example, if someone is chosen to be the tounin, they must go through purification for four years without fail, and always ensure to pray at the shrine at midnight. If they meet with anyone during that time, they are required to restart from the beginning. There were some shrines where even when one finally became tounin, they had to go through further strict training which required them to remain in a room with all impurities removed, and they were restricted from not only meeting women, but from meeting anyone, at all. This was how they gained respect from the villagers, and gained the authority to become tounin. As a general rule, those that were part of the miyaza were the males of the household, but there were female positions, as well.

It is not rare in the current day for rural shrines to struggle to find a successor. There are occasions where the amount of mochi needed is so large that it takes a lot of time and people to prepare them, so much so that it would be impossible for a single shrine priest to take all of that on by themselves. As such, they have to resort to buying already steamed and pounded mochi from stores, and only take on the shaping of the mochi.

Originally, the head priest at Kitano Tenmangu Shrine would stay in their chambers for seven days before a ritual, and would not eat any food made by a woman. It would only be made by the man himself before he attended the ritual. But in 2012, the ritual was eased to only abstaining from meat for three days after taking into consideration the other duties required of the priest. However, the priest taking on the preparation is not simply due to a lack of successors, but rather because the descendents of the followers of Sugawara no Michizane prepare the shinsen themselves. This is because of legends that after Sugawara no Michizane was sent to Dazaifu, and his followers returned to Kyoto with his belongings when Kitano Tenmangu Shrine was built, they were the ones to prepare and offer up the shinsen, continuing on with their lives while purifying the spirits of the dead.

== See also ==
- Osechi
- Omiki
