= Jiuniang =

Chinese rice pudding dish

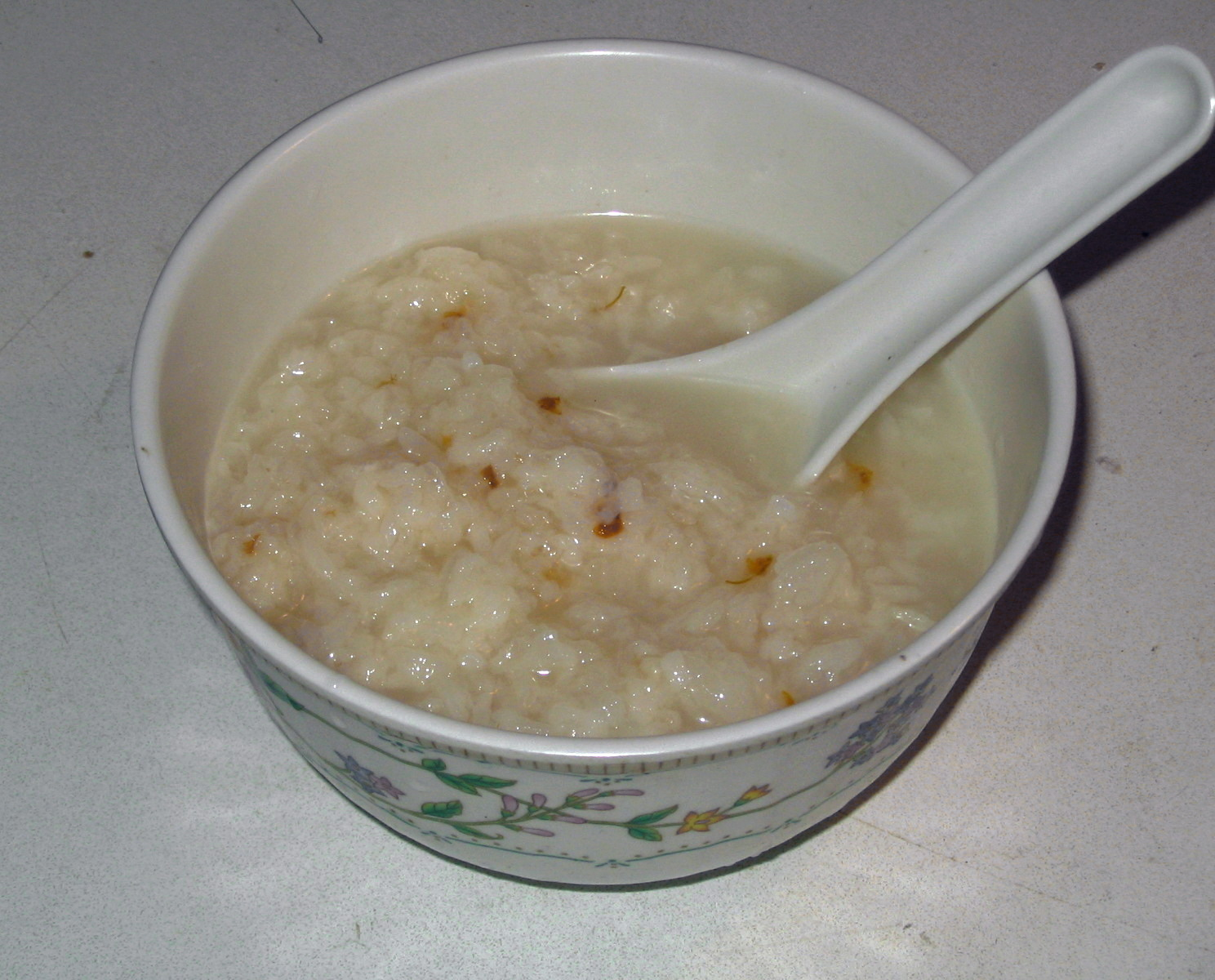
- A bowl of guihua jiuniang
- Type: Rice pudding
- Place of origin: China
- Region or state: East Asia
- Main ingredients: Glutinous rice, fermentation starter (yeast and Aspergillus oryzae)

Jiuniang
- Traditional Chinese: 酒釀
- Simplified Chinese: 酒酿
- Literal meaning: wine brew
Transcriptions
Standard Mandarin
- Hanyu Pinyin: jiǔniàng
Wu
- Romanization: ciu nyang
Yue: Cantonese
- Jyutping: zau2 yeung6

Alternative Chinese name
- Chinese: 醪糟
- Literal meaning: alcohol with dregs
Transcriptions
Standard Mandarin
- Hanyu Pinyin: láozāo

Glutinous rice wine
- Chinese: 江米酒
Transcriptions
Standard Mandarin
- Hanyu Pinyin: jiāngmǐjiǔ

Name in Yunnan
- Chinese: 甜白酒
- Literal meaning: sweet white wine
Transcriptions
Standard Mandarin
- Hanyu Pinyin: tiánbáijiǔ

Jiuniang (酒酿) is a sweet, soup- or pudding-like dish in Chinese cuisine. It is also known as sweet wine or sweet rice wine. It consists of a mixture of partially digested rice grains floating in a sweet saccharified liquid, with small amounts of alcohol (1.5–2%) and lactic acid (0.5%). It is made by fermenting glutinous rice with a starter called jiuqu containing Rhizopus oryzae or Aspergillus oryzae and often yeast and bacteria.

== Ingredients and preparation ==
It was first developed as a by-product of mijiu production and generally speaking is partially digested rice from a young rice wine (or vinegar) ferment. If eaten quickly or held below 10 °C (50 °F), which halts the fermentation, the product can be consumed as jiuniang. If the temperatures are raised and fermentation continues, jiuniang will eventually produce rice wine or rice vinegar. Jiuniang is most commonly made and consumed in the winter, where fermentation can be halted easily.

Jiuniang is often made with sweet osmanthus flowers in a dish is called guihua jiuniang (simplified Chinese: 桂花酒酿; traditional Chinese: 桂花酒釀). It is also often served together with small unfilled tangyuan during the Dongzhi Festival, a Chinese winter holiday dedicated to the ancestors. All forms of jiuniang are typically eaten with a spoon.

== Similar dishes ==
An almost identical food product is made in Southeast Asia. In the Philippines it is called binubudan, in Thailand it is called khao mak, and in Malaysia and Indonesia it is called tapai. In Indonesia it most popularly made with purple/black glutinous rice and called tapai ketan.

It is also similar to the southern Vietnamese dish cơm rượu, which usually contains balls of rice. It is also similar to Korean sikhye and Japanese amazake, although these are thin in texture and considered drinks rather than soups or puddings.

== See also ==
- Amazake – Japanese equivalent of jiuniang
- Gamju
- Mijiu
- Rice pudding
- Sikhye – Korean equivalent of jiuniang
- Tapai
