= Nigori =

Japanese rice-based alcoholic drink

Nigori, Doburoku
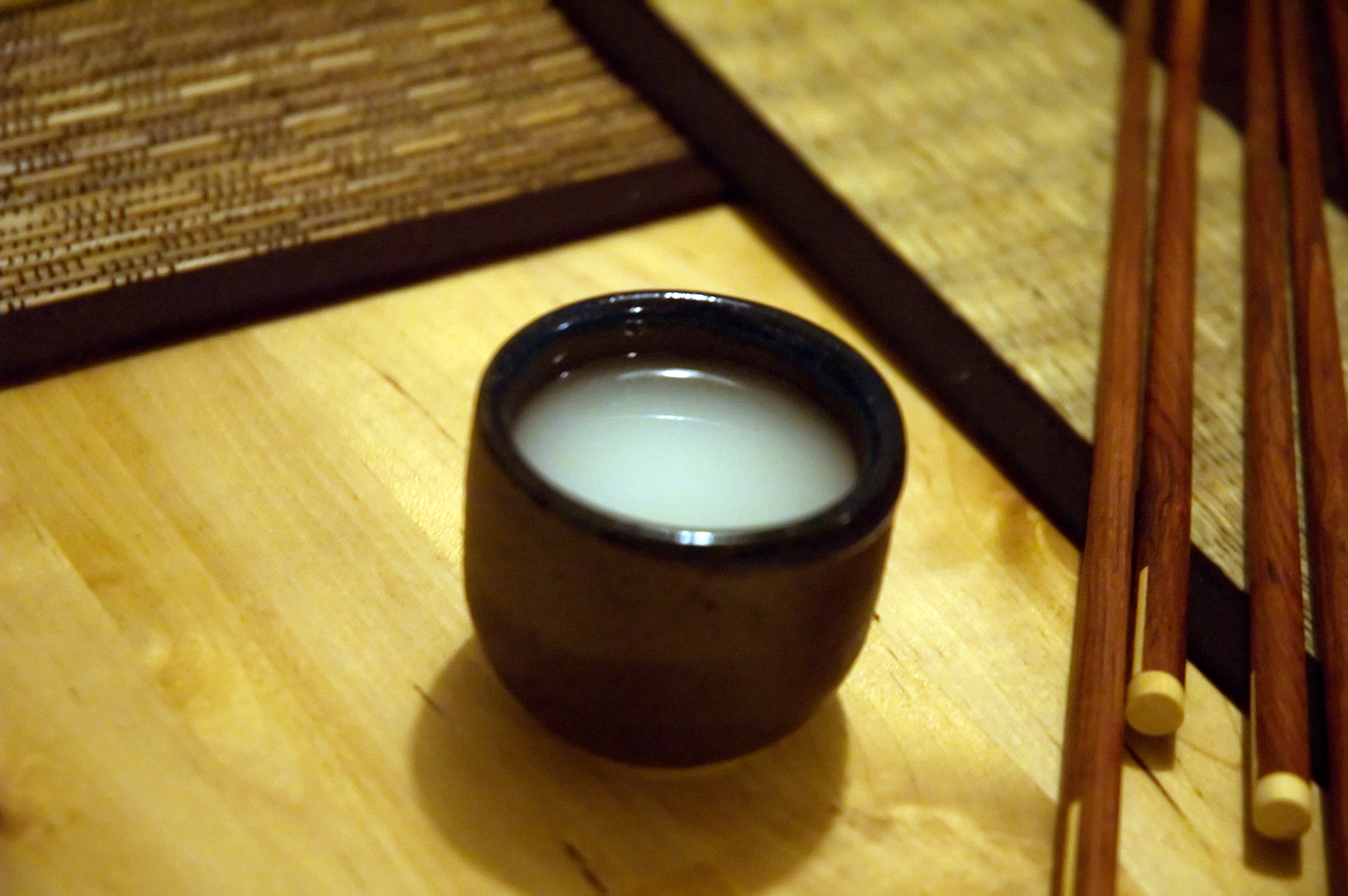
- Nigori sake
- Type: Sake
- Origin: Japan, East Asia
- Introduced: Pre-1800s, reintroduced 1966
- Alcohol by volume: 10.0% - 20.0%
- Colour: Cloudy white
- Related products: Sake, Makgeolli, Amazake, Choujiu

Nigori sake, also called nigorizake (Japanese: 濁り酒, nigorizake, pronounced ni.ɡo.ɾi.za.ke), is a type of Japanese sake (seishu) that is filtered through a coarse mesh, leaving some rice solids suspended in the drink and giving it a cloudy appearance. Unlike clear sake (seishu), nigori sake retains part of the fermentation mash after pressing, but it is still legally classified as seishu under Japanese Liquor Tax Law and is produced by licensed sake breweries using standard sake-making techniques. Nigori sake is distinct from doburoku, which is not pressed at all and remains fully unfiltered.

== Definition and description ==
Nigori sake is made using the same basic brewing process as clear sake, including:

- Parallel saccharification and fermentation using rice kōji
- Pressing (jōsō) to separate liquid from solids

The defining difference is that nigori sake is filtered through a coarse cloth or mesh, rather than the fine filtration used for clear sake. As a result, fine rice particles remain suspended in the liquid.

Typical characteristics include:

- Cloudy or milky appearance
- Fuller mouthfeel than clear sake
- Flavor ranging from dry to sweet, depending on the producer
- Sweetness is not intrinsic to nigori sake; while many examples are sweet, others are dry or crisp.

== Etymology and terminology ==
The term nigori (濁り) means “cloudiness” or “turbidity.” Historically, nigori-zake could refer broadly to unclarified sake, but in modern usage it denotes a filtered sake with retained sediment, distinct from unpressed styles.

Japanese labeling sometimes distinguishes:

- Nigori-zake (濁り酒) — standard cloudy sake
- Usu-nigori (薄濁り) — lightly cloudy sake
- Oni-nigori / Kassei nigori — very thick or bottle-refermented styles (not legal in all export markets)

== Distinction from doburoku ==
Nigori sake is not the same as doburoku, though the two are often confused outside Japan.

Feature	Nigori sake	Doburoku
Pressed	Yes	No
Filtered	Coarse filtration	None
Legal classification	Seishu	Regulated separately
Typical producer	Licensed brewery	Licensed producer or shrine
Texture	Cloudy but pourable	Thick, mash-like

Under Japanese law, nigori sake is treated as standard sake, while doburoku is subject to stricter production controls.

== History ==
Cloudy sake styles were common before the widespread adoption of advanced pressing and clarification techniques. As brewing technology developed, clear sake became dominant, and cloudy styles were increasingly regarded as rustic or informal.

In the late 20th century, nigori sake experienced renewed interest both in Japan and abroad, particularly as part of the diversification of sake styles and the growth of export markets.

== Production ==
Nigori sake production follows standard sake brewing steps:

- Rice polishing and steaming
- Kōji cultivation
- Yeast fermentation
- Pressing (jōsō)
- Coarse filtration, allowing rice sediment to pass

Some nigori sake is lightly pasteurized; others may be unpasteurized (namazake), requiring refrigeration.

== Serving and use ==
Nigori sake is often gently mixed before serving to redistribute settled rice solids. It is commonly served chilled and pairs well with spicy foods, rich dishes, or desserts, though pairing practices vary.

== Legal classification ==
Nigori sake is legally classified as seishu under Japan's Liquor Tax Law (酒税法) and is subject to the same licensing, taxation, and quality regulations as clear sake. It does not fall under the legal category of doburoku and is not subject to special-zone provisions.

== See also ==
- Sake
- Doburoku
- Amazake
