= Dansul =

Korean rice wine

- Type: Rice wine
- Origin: Korea, East Asia
- Alcohol by volume: 2‒3%
- Ingredients: Rice, glutinous rice, nuruk

Korean name
- Hangul: 단술
- Lit.: sweet wine
- RR: dansul
- MR: tansul
- IPA: tan.sul

Alternate name
- Hangul: 감주
- Hanja: 甘酒
- RR: gamju
- MR: kamju
- IPA: kam.dʑu

Dansul (Korean: 단술; pronounced [tan.sul]; lit. 'sweet wine') or gamju (감주; [kam.dʑu]) is a milky (or cloudy) Korean rice wine made with rice, glutinous rice, and nuruk (fermentation starter). Due to the incomplete fermentation of the rice, the wine has relatively low alcohol content (2‒3% ABV) and sweet and slightly tangy notes.

== Preparation ==
Steamed rice and/or glutinous rice is mixed with nuruk (fermentation starter), lightly pounded, and heated in water until the temperature reaches 60 °C (140 °F). It is left to ferment for several hours at 60 °C (140 °F), and sieved before served.

== See also ==
- Jiuniang – Chinese equivalent of Dansul
- Amazake – Japanese equivalent of Dansul
