= List of rice drinks =

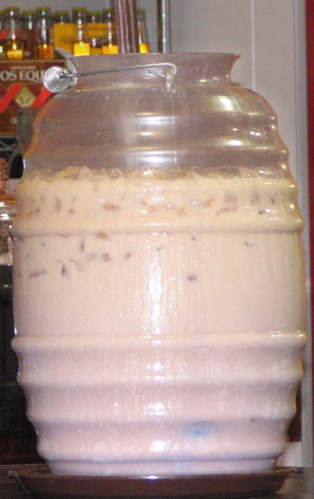
Horchata is the name of several kinds of drinks made of rice, ground almonds, sesame seeds, barley, or tigernuts (chufas).

This is a list of notable rice drinks. This list contains fermented and unfermented drinks made from rice.

== Rice drinks ==
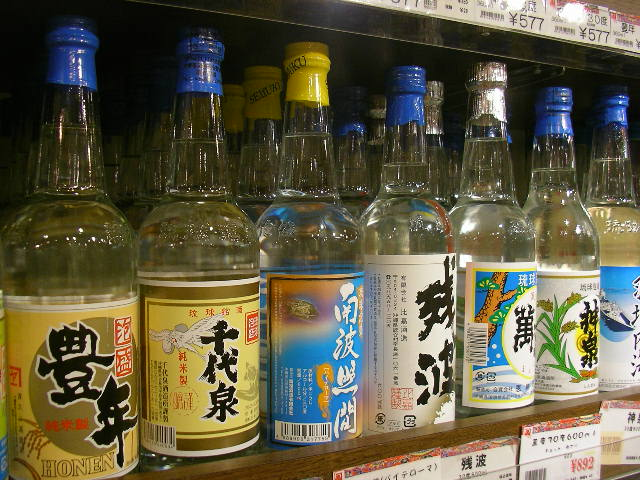
Awamori is an alcoholic beverage indigenous to and unique to Okinawa, Japan.

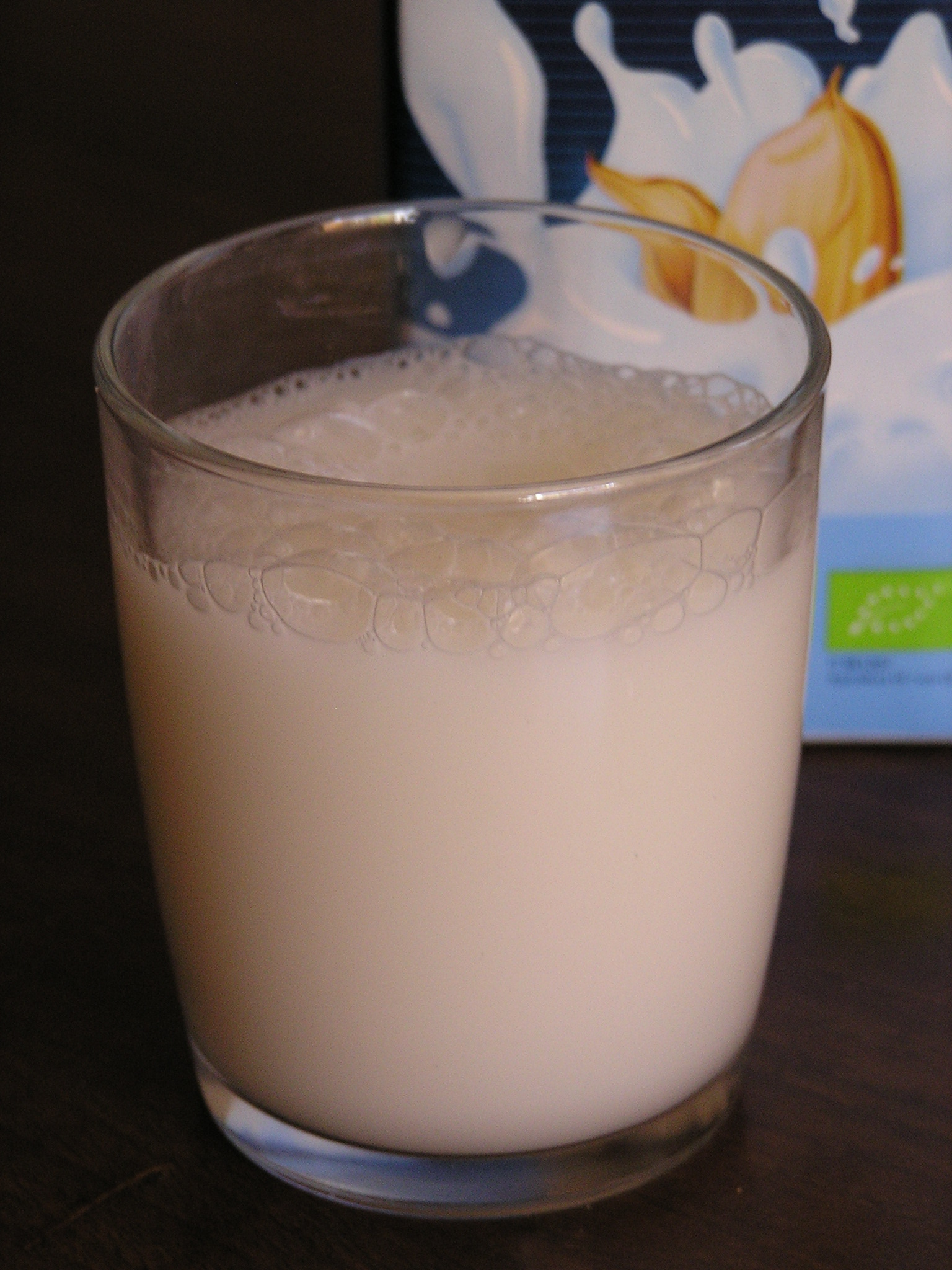
A glass of rice milk

- Andong soju
- Awamori
- Apo (drink)
- Black vinegar
- Genmaicha
- Handia (drink)
- Horchata
- Huangjiu
- Hyeonmi cha
- Jūrokucha
- Kokkoh
- Mijiu
- Rice baijiu
- Rice milk
- Rice water
- Sikhye
- Soju

=== Rice wine ===
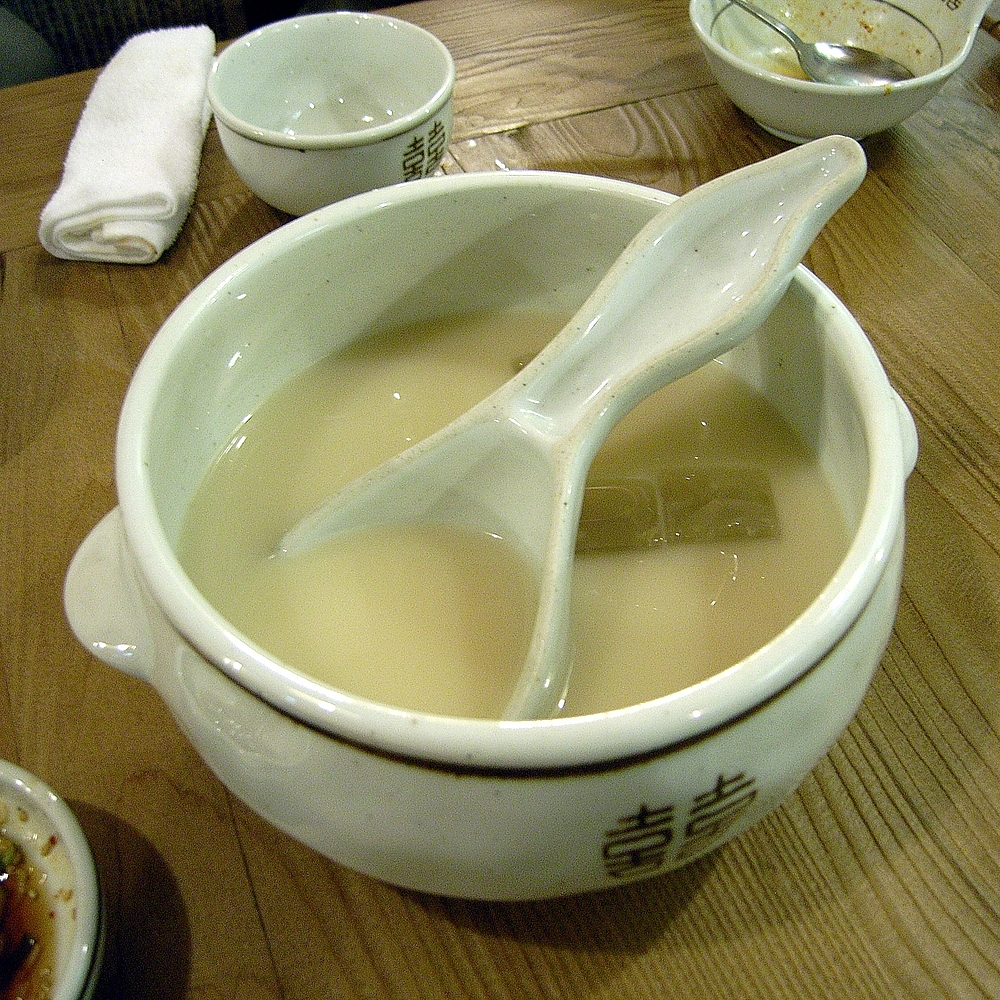
Makgeolli is an alcoholic drink native to Korea that is prepared from a mixture of wheat and rice, which gives it a milky, off-white color, and sweetness.

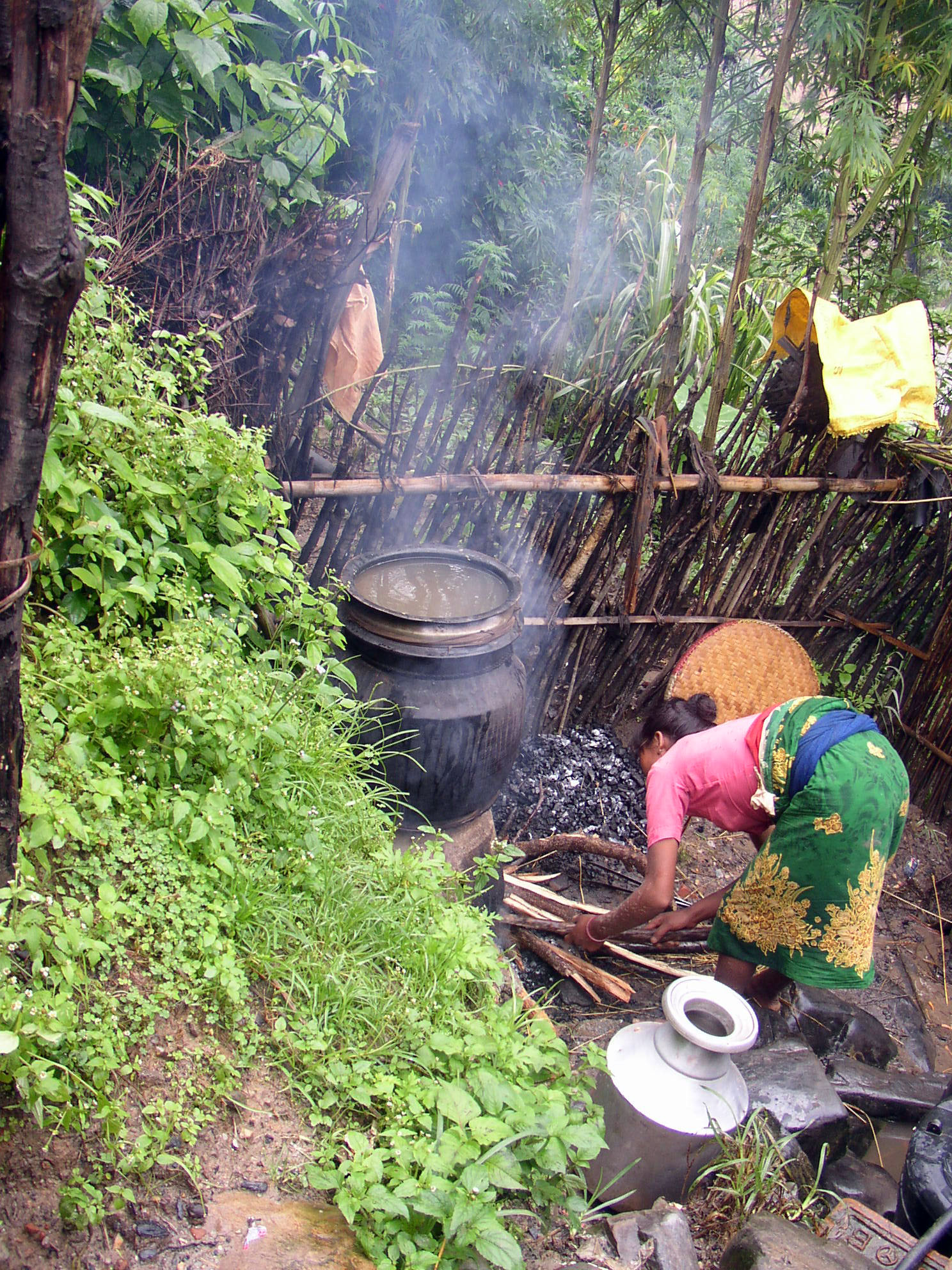
Raksi being distilled in Nepal

Rice wine is an alcoholic drink made from rice.

- Apo (drink)
- Ara (drink)
- Beopju
- Brem
- Cheongju (wine)
- Chhaang
- Choujiu
- Chuak
- Cơm rượu
- Gamju
- Gekkeikan
- Jiuniang
- Kanghaju
- Makgeolli
- Mirin
- Pinjopo
- Raksi
- Rượu cần
- Rượu đế
- Rượu nếp
- Sato (rice wine)
- Shoutoku
- Snake wine
- Sonti (beverage)
- Tapuy
- Thuthse
- Toso
- Tuak
- Zutho
- Zu

=== Sake ===
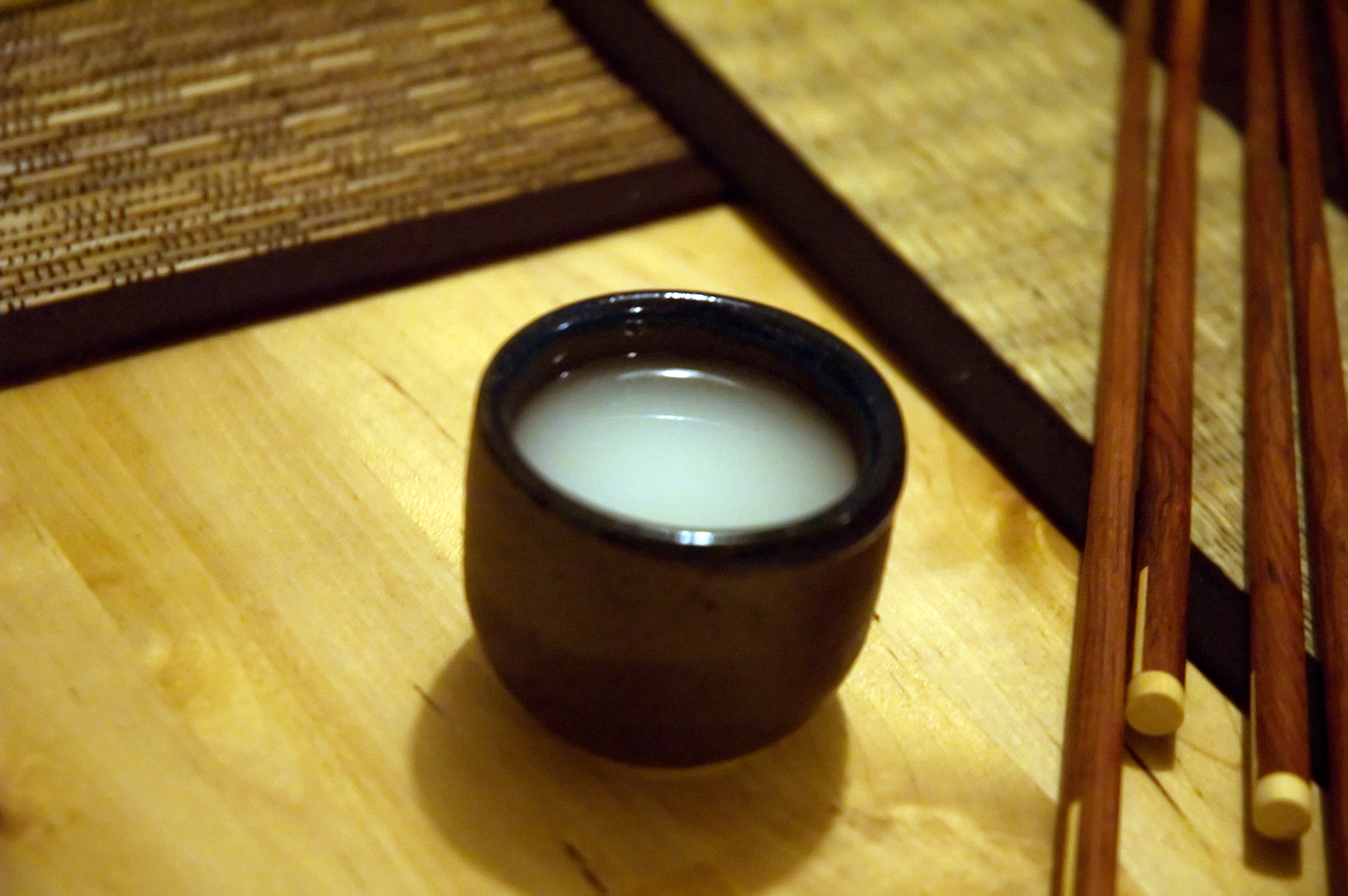
The term nigori translates roughly to "cloudy" because of its appearance.

Sake is an alcoholic drink of Japanese origin that is made from fermented rice.

- Amazake
- Nigori
- Shoutoku
- Sawanotsuru
- Gekkeikan
- Sudo Honke
- TY KU

==== Cocktails with sake ====
- Ginza Mary
- Sake bomb
- Saketini
- Tamagozake

== See also ==
- Korean alcoholic beverages
- Chinese alcoholic beverages
- Du Kang
- Sake set
- Aspergillus oryzae
- Amylolytic process
- Sake kasu
