= Phú Lộc rice wine =

Viatnamese rice-based spirit

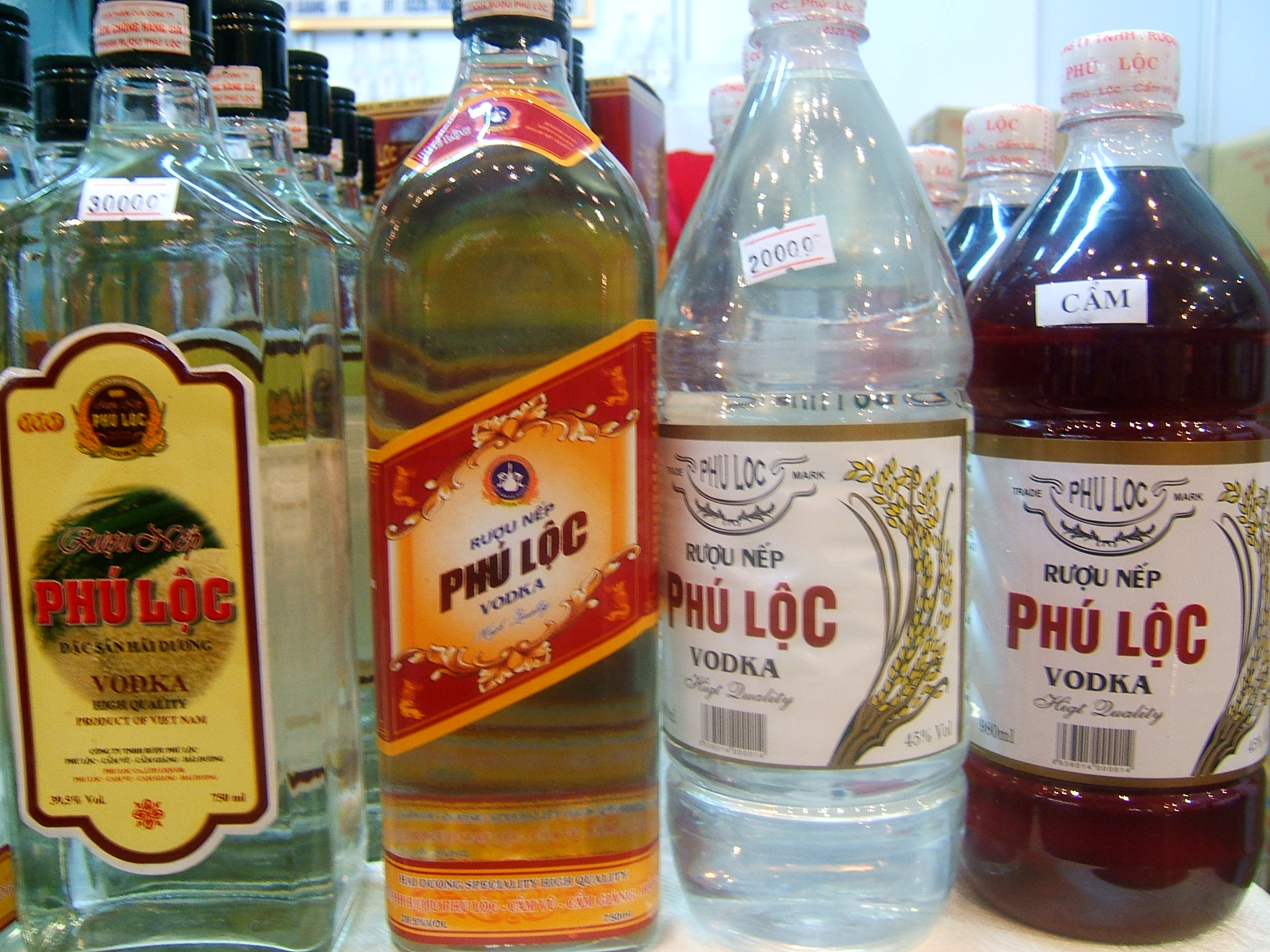
Phú Lộc rice wine

Phú Lộc rice wine is a rice-based spirit locally distilled from the village of Phú Lộc in Cẩm Giàng District, Hải Dương province of Vietnam. The spirit is made from sticky rice fermented with a traditional strain of yeast. Traditionally most of the villagers were engaged in the production of rice spirit. The residue of the distillation process was fed to the pigs and this often created the primary income of the villagers.

The Phú Lộc spirit geographical indication is now owned by the Phu Loc wine Co. Ltd. based in the Phú Lộc village.

== See also ==
- Cuisine of Vietnam
- Cơm rượu
- Rượu cần
- Rượu đế
- Rượu thuốc
- Rice wine
- Vietnamese wine
