= Thuthse =

Alcoholic beverage of Naga origin

- Type: Rice wine
- Origin: India, Nagaland
- Introduced: Naga people
- Color: White
- Ingredients: Glutinous rice
- Related products: Judima, zutho, choujiu

Thuthse (or Thutshe) is a fermented alcoholic beverage made from sticky rice in the Indian state of Nagaland.

== History ==
It is the traditional drink of the Angami and Chakhesang Nagas, but now it is commonly consumed by all Nagas in Nagaland.

== Brewing ==
Thuthse is prepared from glutinous rice, locally called kemenya. Sprouted rice or starter cakes, known as akhri is used for the fermentation process. The rice is soaked in cold water for an hour and then drained. Thereafter, it is left to dry for two to three hours. This rice is then pounded into fine powder with pikhe, a large wooden pestle. This powdered rice is transferred to litho, earthen pots, and mixed with water to form a thicken solution. To this, akhri is added to start the fermentation process, and left for four to five days. In winters, this process takes more time, i.e. six to seven days. The liquid is then, filtered.

Thuthse is similar to Zutho but is thicker, stronger, and sweeter.

== Cultural beliefs ==
Thuthse and Zutho are considered an antidote for gaining stamina, regulating low blood pressure and ailing high fever and body weakness, according to elders.

== Serving ==
Thutse is traditionally served in bamboo mugs and buffalo horns.

== See also ==
- Zutho
- Bitchi
- List of rice beverages
