= Judima =

GI tagged traditional wine of India

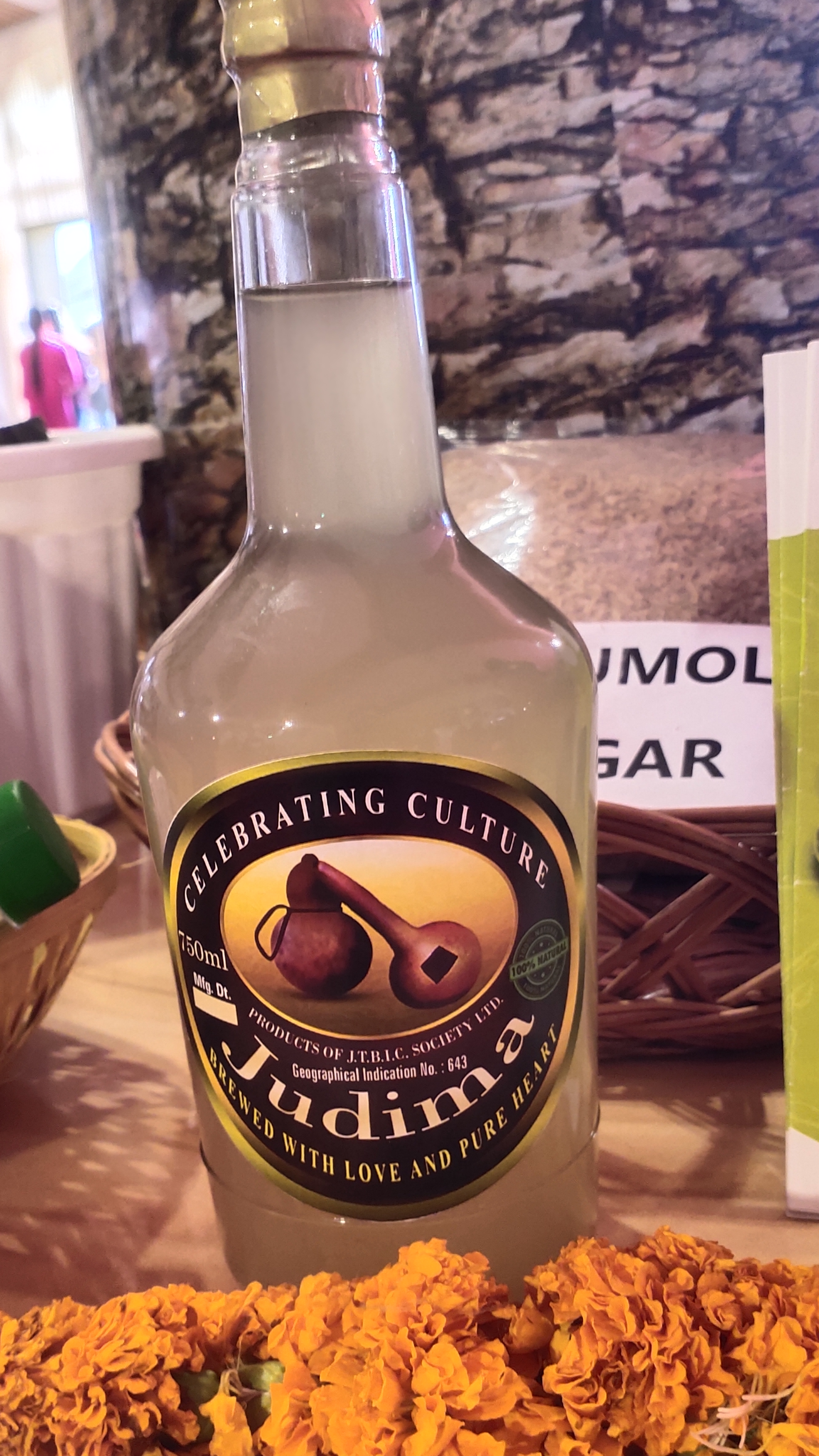
- Judima rice wine bottle
- Type: Rice wine
- Origin: North east India, Assam; Nagaland
- Introduced: Dimasa people
- Color: pale yellow or reddish
- Ingredients: Glutinous rice
- Related products: Zutho, thuthse, choujiu

Judima is a traditional ethnic rice wine associated with the Dimasa people of Assam. It has received a geographical indication tag in 2021. It is prepared from a starter kit, and is distinguished by the use of a wild herb local to Dima Hasao district called thembra (Senegalia pennata). It is used ritualistically by the Dimasa people in events such as birth, marriage and death.

== Traditional process ==
Judima is prepared in broadly a two-step process—the preparation of the starter cake and the use of the starter cake to ferment cooked rice.

The starter cake for Judima is called Humao. It is prepared from the dried powdered thembra bark, made into a dough with rice powder and water and then air-dried.

For fermentation glutinous bora rice is used, and among its may varieties the one called bairing is preferred. The rice is boiled/steamed, and then spread to cool over banana leaves. The starter cake is crushed and mixed with the cooled rice, and then set aside in earthen vessels for three to five days (longer in the winters). At the end of this period, the liquid that is produced is strained—which is Judima.

Judima that is distilled is called Juharo.
