= Vietnamese wine =

Wine making in Vietnam

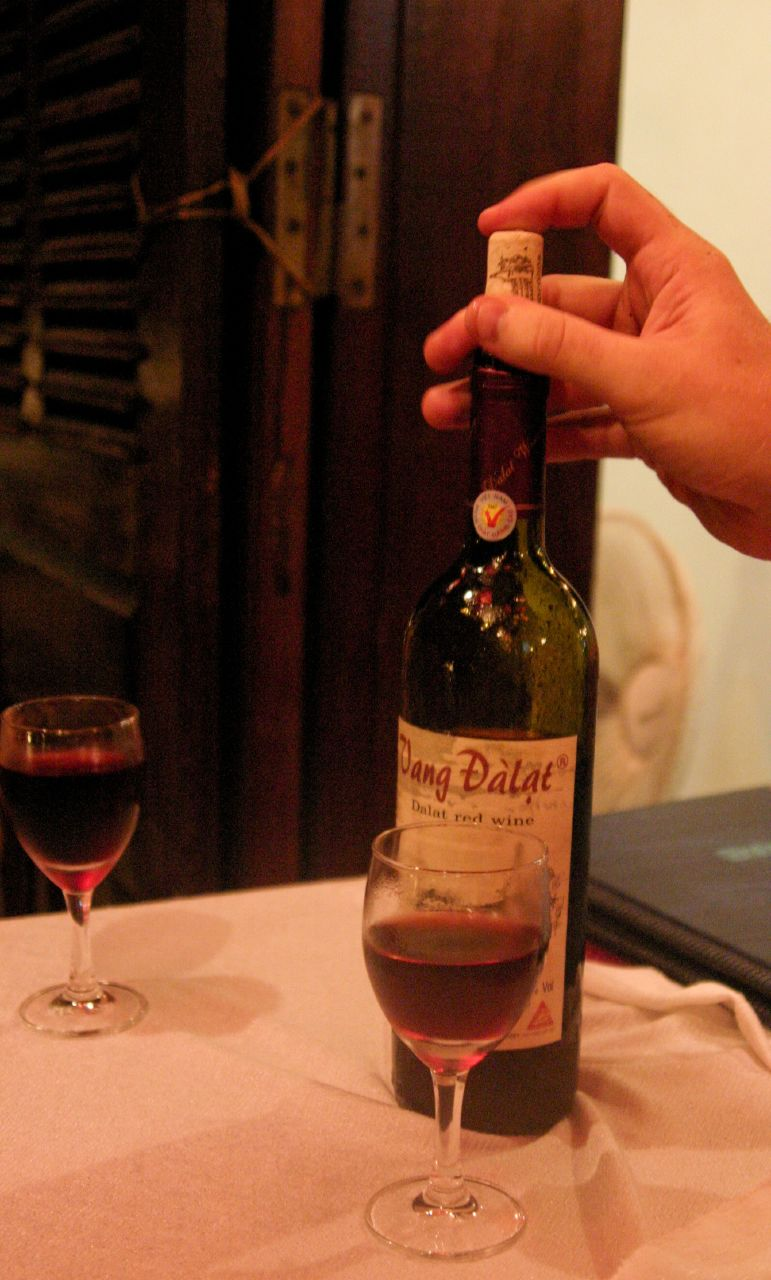
- A bottle of Vietnamese wine
- Type: Alcoholic beverage
- Origin: Vietnam
- Variants: Wine

Vietnamese wine is wine produced in Vietnam. The area was first cultivated for viticulture during the French colonial rule of the region in the late 19th century. The region's tropical climate was ill-suited for the type of Vitis vinifera that the French colonists were used to and the wine industry turned its attention to fruit wine production. The late 20th century saw a renewed focus on the development of Vitis vinifera with the assistance of flying winemakers from regions like Australia. In 1995, a joint venture with Australian winemakers started an aggressive planting scheme to reintroduce international grape varieties like Cabernet Sauvignon and Chardonnay to land that was until recently littered with landmines left over from the Vietnam War.

== Viticulture and geography ==
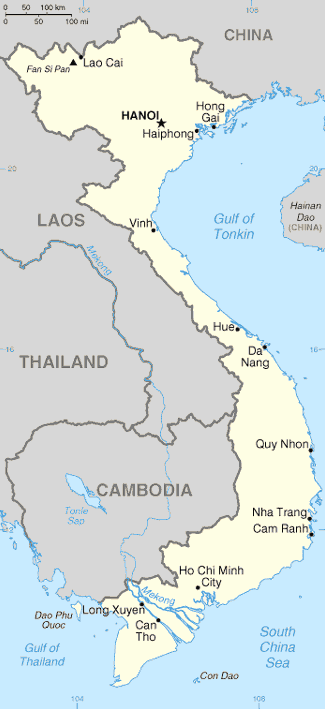
Map of Vietnam

Vietnam is located between the Tropic of Cancer and the Equator and has a climate typical of a tropical region marked by high humidity and a rainy summer season. The topography of Vietnam is very hilly which can provide some relief from the tropical influences and also create various microclimates where viticulture could thrive. The Gulf of Tonkin, Mekong and Red Rivers also have a tempering effect on the climate. Due to the year round warmth, vineyards in the southern region of Vietnam can produce a harvest up to three times during the course of a calendar year. Some plant varieties can produce fruit from new cuttings within a year of their planting.

French colonists planted their vineyards in the highlands areas around the Ba Vì mountain range near Hanoi. Modern viticultural techniques have produced some successful results with aggressive pruning and the adoption of the pergolas style of trellising. This Pergolas trellis has the benefit of keeping the grapevines off the ground to where some of the humidity is ventilated which reduces the risk of powdery mildews developing. The grape bunches are shaded by the canopy of the vine which reduces the yields.

Other areas with vineyard plantings include the Central Highland region along the Annamite Range and the southern coastal plain of the Ninh Thuận around Phan Rang – Tháp Chàm where Vietnam's first commercial winery Thien Thai Winery is located.

== Grapes and wines ==
As of 2005, the main grape varieties planted in Vietnam are the Cardinal and Chambourcin grapes. A large form of wine production is from fruit wines made from the country's abundance of local fruits. The British firm Allied Domecq and Australian winemakers were working on introducing more international grape varieties into the region as well as experimenting with sparkling wine production. Many new vineyards sites are being planted in areas recently demined.

== See also ==
- Japanese wine
- Winemaking
- Agriculture in Vietnam
- Wine in China
- Rượu đế
- Rượu thuốc
- Rượu nếp
- Cơm rượu
