= Ya dong =

Thai herbal alcoholic drink

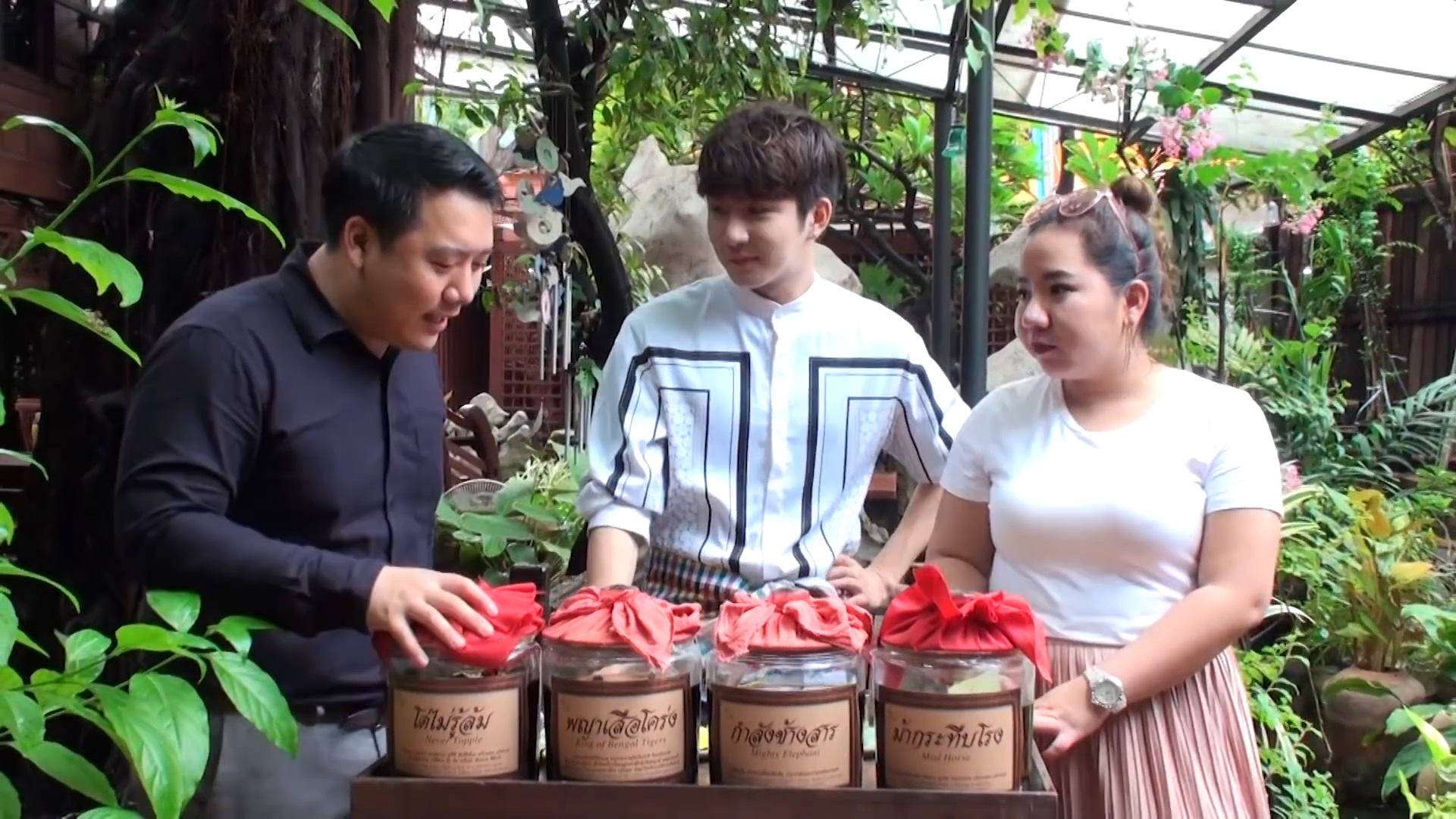
Jars of ya dong, with labels describing their properties, shown on a web variety show

Ya dong (Thai: ยาดอง 'infused medicine'), or more specifically ya dong lao (ยาดองเหล้า 'spirit-infused medicine'), is a form of Thai herbal alcoholic drink, consisting of medicinal herbs infused in a spirit, typically lao khao. It developed as a method in traditional Thai medicine for the extraction of herbal active ingredients, and was typically consumed in small amounts for perceived medicinal benefits.

While ya dong may legally be prescribed as a tincture by traditional medicine practitioners, in modern times, with legal restriction on alcohol production, it has become associated with illegal spirit production and is often described in English as moonshine. It is widely seen as a drink of the lower socioeconomic class, and is usually sold from jars at streetside stalls. From 2015, however, several upscale bars have developed their own versions, and the drink has also been introduced to the United States.

Cases of mass methanol poisoning have occurred in Thailand from the production and distribution of ya dong. In October 2019, twenty-two people were injured in Chon Buri province, five of whom died, from a contaminated batch of ya dong. In August 2024, another incident in Bangkok led to forty-four hospitalizations and ten deaths.

== See also ==
- Rượu thuốc, a similar drink in Vietnam
