= Rice water =

Water used in boiling rice

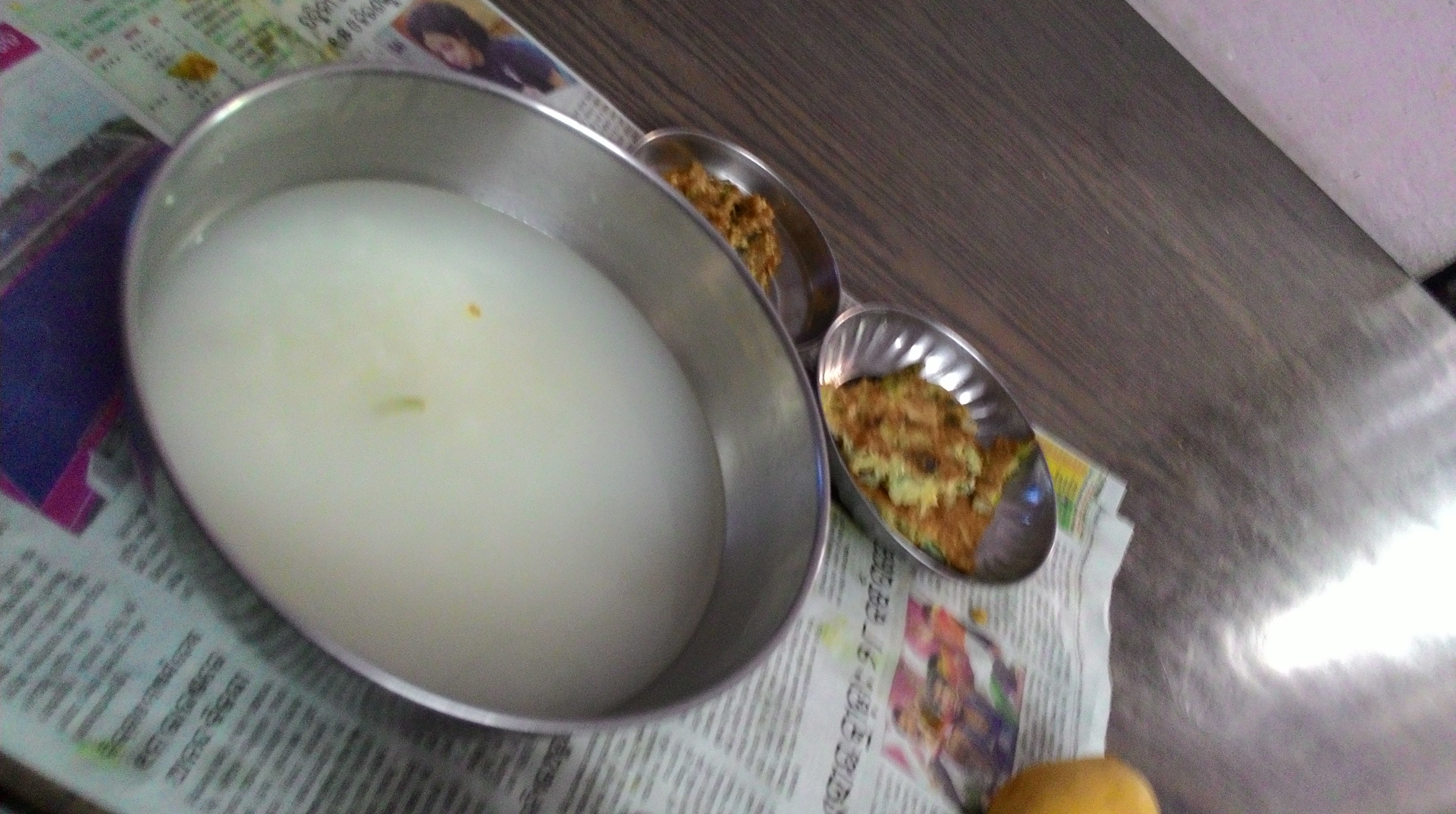
Rice water

Rice water is a suspension of starch obtained by draining boiled rice or by boiling rice until it completely dissolves into the water. It has sometimes been used as food for people with medical conditions affecting the digestive system. It has been claimed to be particularly effective in the treatment of diarrhea such as that arising in cholera or gastroenteritis.

== History ==
Historically, women in various Asian regions such as China, Japan, and Southeast Asia have applied rice water as a hair treatment for hundreds of years. The use of rice water has dated back to the Heian period (794CE to 1185CE) in Japan. Japanese women during this time period were known to have floor-length hair kept healthy by bathing it in rice water.

== See also ==
- Rice milk
- Congee
- Barley water
- List of rice beverages
