= Rượu thuốc =

Vietnamese distilled liquor

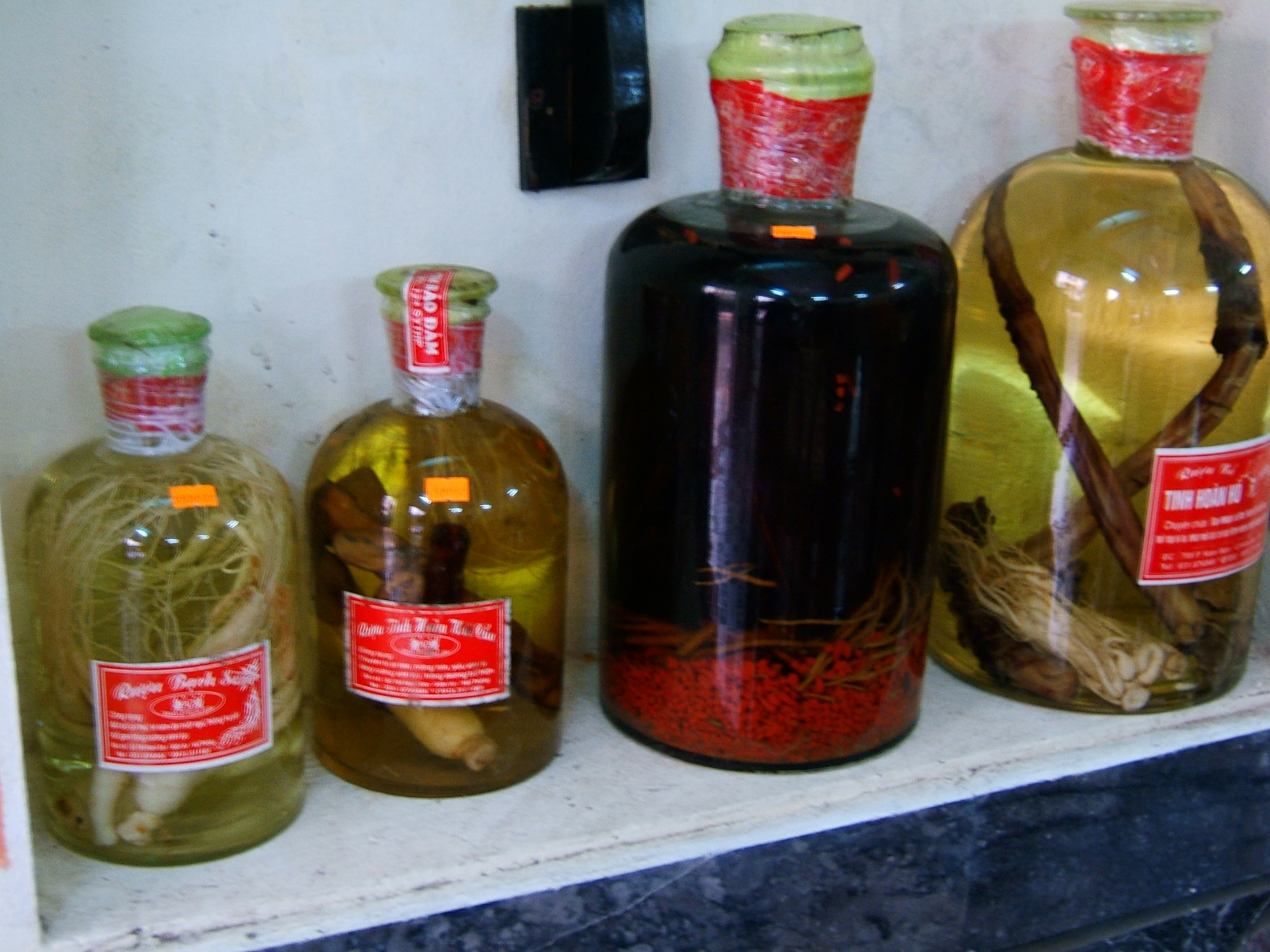
Several varieties of rượu thuốc. The first bottle from the right is tiger penis rượu thuốc

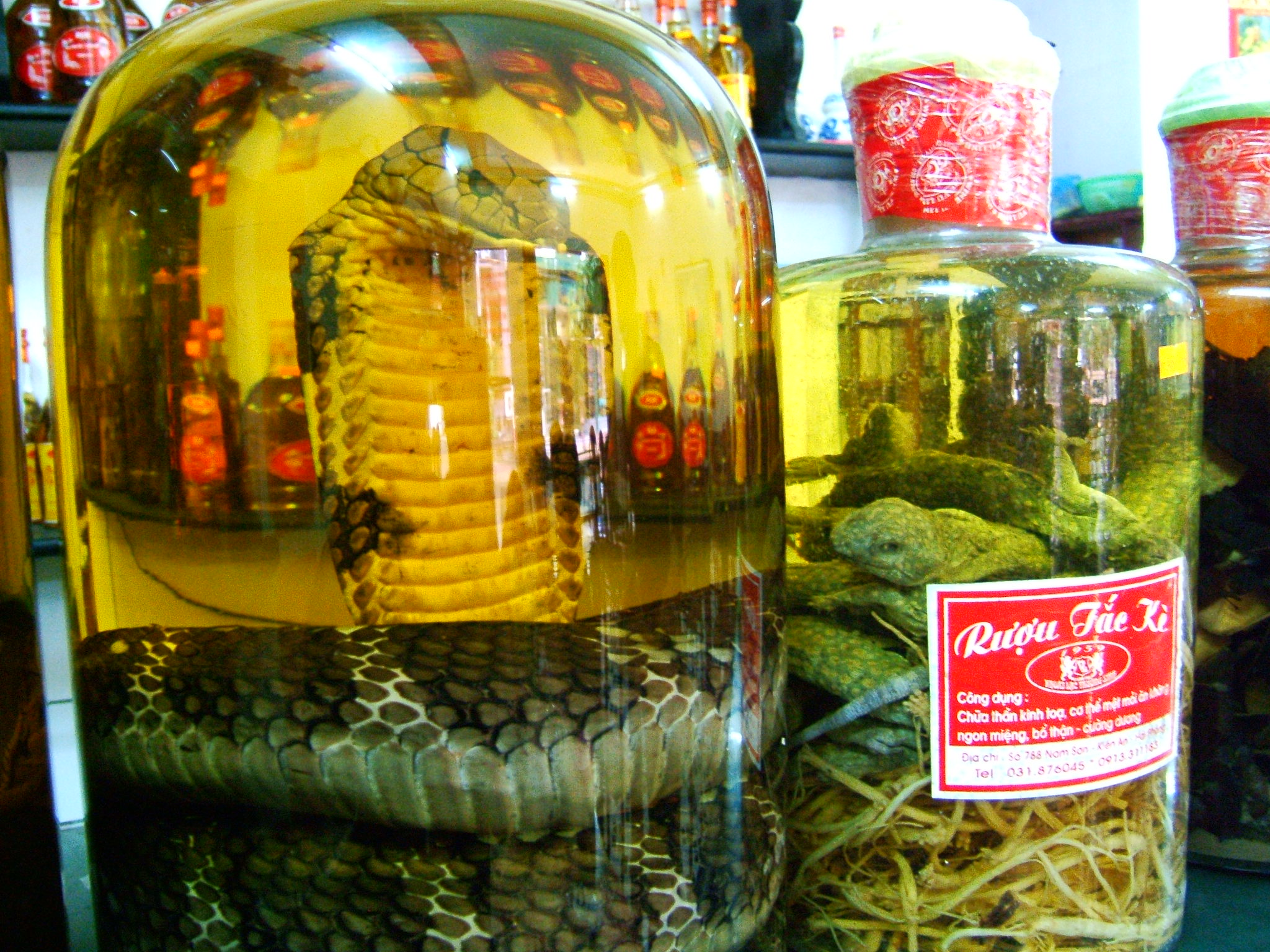
Several varieties of rượu thuốc. The first bottle from the right is gecko rượu thuốc, and the other is cobra rượu thuốc

Rượu thuốc (lit. 'medicinal liquor') or rượu dân tộc (lit. 'traditional liquor') is a kind of Vietnamese distilled liquor (rượu) with herbs and animals, considered by traditional medicine to be good for health. This drink consists of herbs or animals soaked in alcohol as a folk medicine cure for diseases in Vietnam. In Vietnam, rượu thuốc is widely believed to help drinkers improve their health and virility.

== Production ==
A popular type of rượu thuốc is snake wine (rượu rắn), which, according to traditional belief, can cure multiple diseases including far sightedness, hair loss, back pain, digestive problems, fertility problems and even leprosy. The general principle of preparation is soaking venomous snakes in alcohol, where ethanol will denature protein-based snake venom. In one method, the snakes can be soaked, or macerated in wine along with other ingredients with medicinal properties in Chinese medicine to remove odour. Another method of preparation is extracting blood and bile from a snake and its gallbladder and mixing it with rice wine or grain wine to be consumed immediately.

== Consumption ==
Rượu thuốc is typically drunk before a meal in a shot glass or thimble-sized cups. It is also used in drinking sessions and as souvenir gifts from a trip, as each region has its own variety of rượu thuốc. It is traditionally believed that drinking rượu thuốc may cure or alleviate several diseases.

Ingesting any form of venomous snake wine may cause systemic envenomation from the contained venom, which may present features differing from direct envenomation by snakebite. A number of health problems of the vascular system may result, including damage to the vascular wall endothelium, abnormal platelet function, and coagulopathy.

== See also ==
- Cơm rượu
- Rice wine
- Rượu cần
- Rượu nếp
- Rượu đế
- Snake wine
- Ya dong, a similar drink in Thailand
