= Snake wine =

Alcoholic beverage brewed with snakes

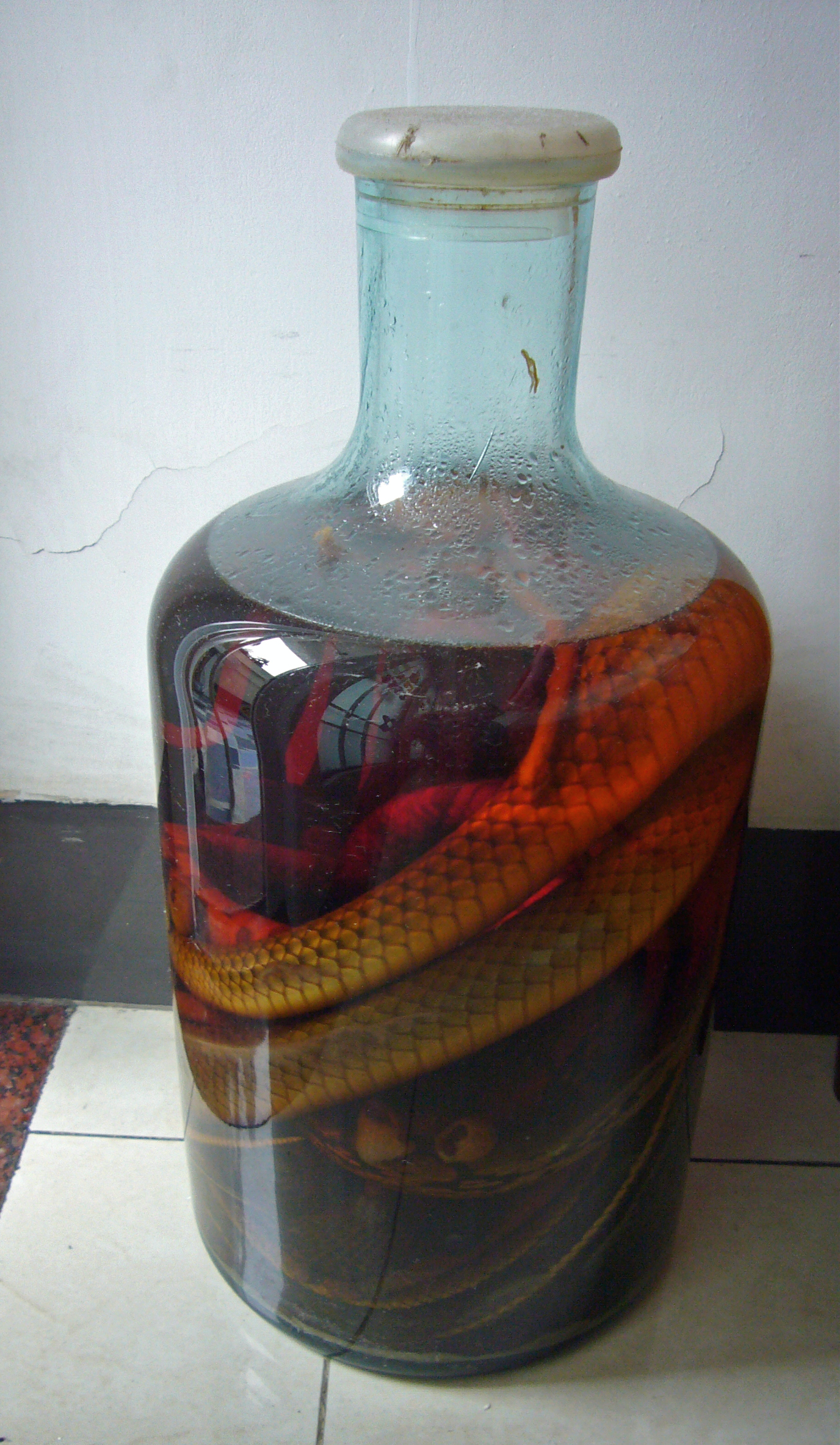
A bottle of snake wine photographed in the southern Chinese city of Guangzhou

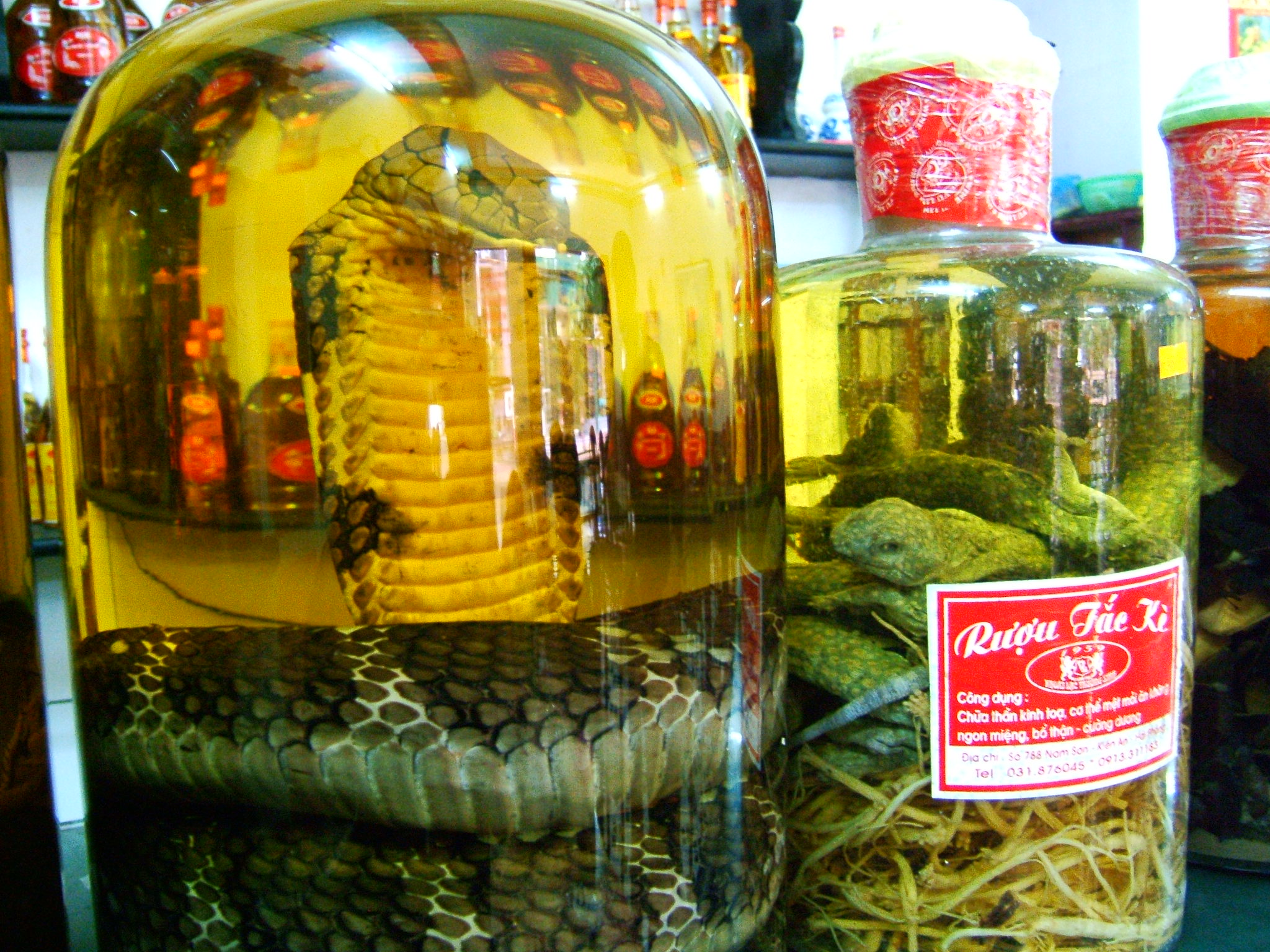
Snake is one of Vietnamese varieties of rượu thuốc. The bottle on the left is a cobra wine (Rượu rắn).

Snake wine (Chinese: 蛇酒; pinyin: shé-jiǔ; Vietnamese: rượu rắn; Khmer: ស្រាពស់, sra poas; Korean: 뱀술, baemsul) is an alcoholic beverage produced by infusing whole snakes in rice wine or grain alcohol. The drink was first recorded to have been consumed in China during the Western Zhou dynasty (c. 1040–770 BC) and thought in folklore to reinvigorate a person according to Traditional Chinese medicine. It is a traditional drink in much of East Asia and Southeast Asia.

The snakes, preferably venomous ones, are not usually preserved for their meat but to have their "essence" or venom dissolved in the liquor. The snake venom proteins are unfolded by the ethanol and therefore the completed beverage is usually, but not always, safe to drink.

== History ==
Consumption of snakes and their viscera has long been considered by followers of traditional Chinese medicine to promote health. Snake wine was first recorded to be used in China during the Western Zhou dynasty (771 BC) and the supposed medicinal benefits of snakes was noted in the medical manual Shen nong ben cao jing (神農本草經) compiled between 300 B.C. and 200 A.D. The detailed uses of various snake feces, their body parts, and various preparations were elaborated in Li Shizhen's Bencao Gangmu (本草綱目). Snake bile was offered to the Chinese Ming dynasty statesman Yang Jisheng as treatment for the injuries he suffered in prison circa 1554.

=== In culture ===
In Vietnam, the common regional name for snake wines is rượu thuốc, while less common ones are referred to as rượu rắn. A similar drink is made with dehydrated geckos or sea horses rather than snakes. It is illegal to import snake wine to many countries because many of the snakes used for its production are endangered species. Snake liquor, made with asps infused in grain alcohol, is a specialty in North Korea.

== Health risks ==
The risks of ingesting snake wine include systemic envenomation from the contained venom, which may present features differing from direct envenomation by snakebite. A number of health problems of the vascular system may result, including damage to the vascular wall endothelium, abnormal platelet function, and coagulopathy.

There is a folk belief that snake wine enhances male potency. However, according to health experts, this is not true, and the misuse or abuse of snake wine can cause impotence or even infertility.

== See also ==
- Elixir
- Folk medicine
- Habushu
- Panacea
- Theriaca
- Snake oil
