= Maria McIlvaine Gillmore =

American writer and missionary (1871–1965)

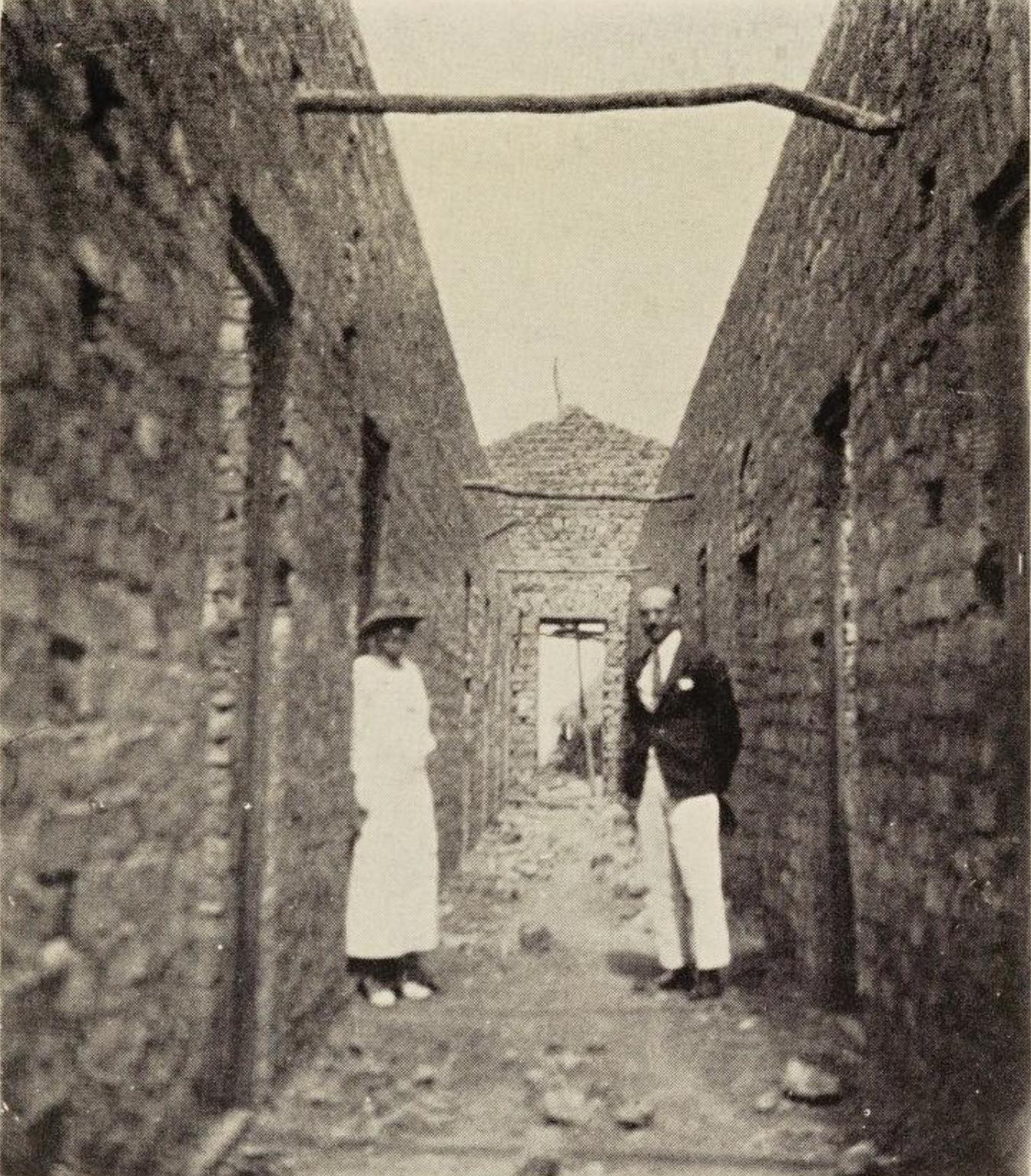
- Gillmore (left) and Dr. Wood (right) in the corridor of the new hospital in Ponte Nova, Brazil, 1926
- Born: Maria McIlvaine; May 8, 1871; Trenton, New Jersey, U.S.
- Died: January 12, 1965 (aged 93); Summit, New Jersey, U.S.
- Occupations: Cookbook writer; Presbyterian missionary
- Spouse: Henry Van Kleeck Gillmore (m. 1905; died 1911)

Maria McIlvaine Gillmore (born Maria McIlvaine; May 8, 1871 – January 12, 1965) was an American cookbook writer and Presbyterian missionary. She authored Meatless Cookery (1914) and Economy Cook Book (1918). She later joined the Commission Appointed to Visit Chile and Brazil by the Board of Foreign Missions of the Presbyterian Church, and contributed to the book Modern Missions in Chile and Brazil (1926).

== Biography ==
=== Early and personal life ===
Maria McIlvaine was born in Trenton, New Jersey, on May 8, 1871. Her parents were Edward Shippen McIlvaine (1843–1910) and Annie Belleville McIlvaine (née Hunt; 1842–1918). She had two sisters and one brother, and was privately educated.

She married Henry Van Kleeck Gillmore on June 21, 1905. He was the grandson of General Quincy Adams Gillmore and served in the Spanish–American War. He died from pneumonia in 1911.

Gillmore later moved to New York City, where she managed hostess houses at Camp Upton from 1917 to 1918. She was a member of several societies, including the Japan Society, the Asiatic Society, and the American-Oriental Club.

=== Cookbook writing ===
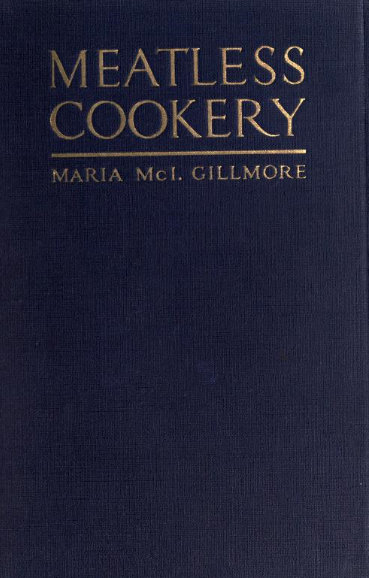
1914 cover of Meatless Cookery

==== Meatless Cookery ====
In 1914, Gillmore published Meatless Cookery: With Special Reference to Diet for Heart Disease, Blood Pressure and Autointoxication. The book was concerned with diet in relation to heart disease, blood pressure, and auto-intoxication.

The introduction, by Louis F. Bishop, discussed the application of medical advice to everyday diet and argued that some people could become sensitive to proteins in meat, eggs, fish, and stock soups. The book included a chapter on "Meat Substitutes", with recipes for cereal coffee, almond milk, rice milk, and peanut butter sandwiches, and included nutritional information on peanuts and peanut butter.

Akiko Aoyagi and William Shurtleff describe Meatless Cookery as the first book to argue that a vegetarian diet may reduce the risk of coronary heart disease, and as containing the earliest known English-language recipe using the term rice milk.

==== Economy Cook Book ====
In 1918, Gillmore published Economy Cook Book, a handbook on meal planning, nutrition, and wartime cookery. It recommended protein-rich foods such as meat, fish, and milk for children, and lighter diets for adults, especially those over forty.

The book also reflected wartime food-conservation priorities, with recipes designed to reduce the use of wheat, meat, sugar, and fats. It suggested substitutes such as vegetable oils, cornmeal, and honey, and included menus intended to reduce waste while maintaining nutritional balance.

=== Missionary work ===
McIlvaine was active in the First Presbyterian Church in Trenton. She later joined the Commission Appointed to Visit Chile and Brazil by the Board of Foreign Missions of the Presbyterian Church. The commission visited Presbyterian missions in both countries, and Gillmore contributed to Modern Missions in Chile and Brazil, a book based on the commission's work.

=== Death ===
Gillmore died at a nursing home in Summit, New Jersey, on January 12, 1965. She was buried at West Point Cemetery.

== Publications ==
- Meatless Cookery: With Special Reference to Diet for Heart Disease, Blood Pressure and Autointoxication (New York: E. P. Dutton, 1914)
- Economy Cook Book (New York: E. P. Dutton, 1918)
