= Hakka rice wine =

Rice wine used in Hakka cuisine

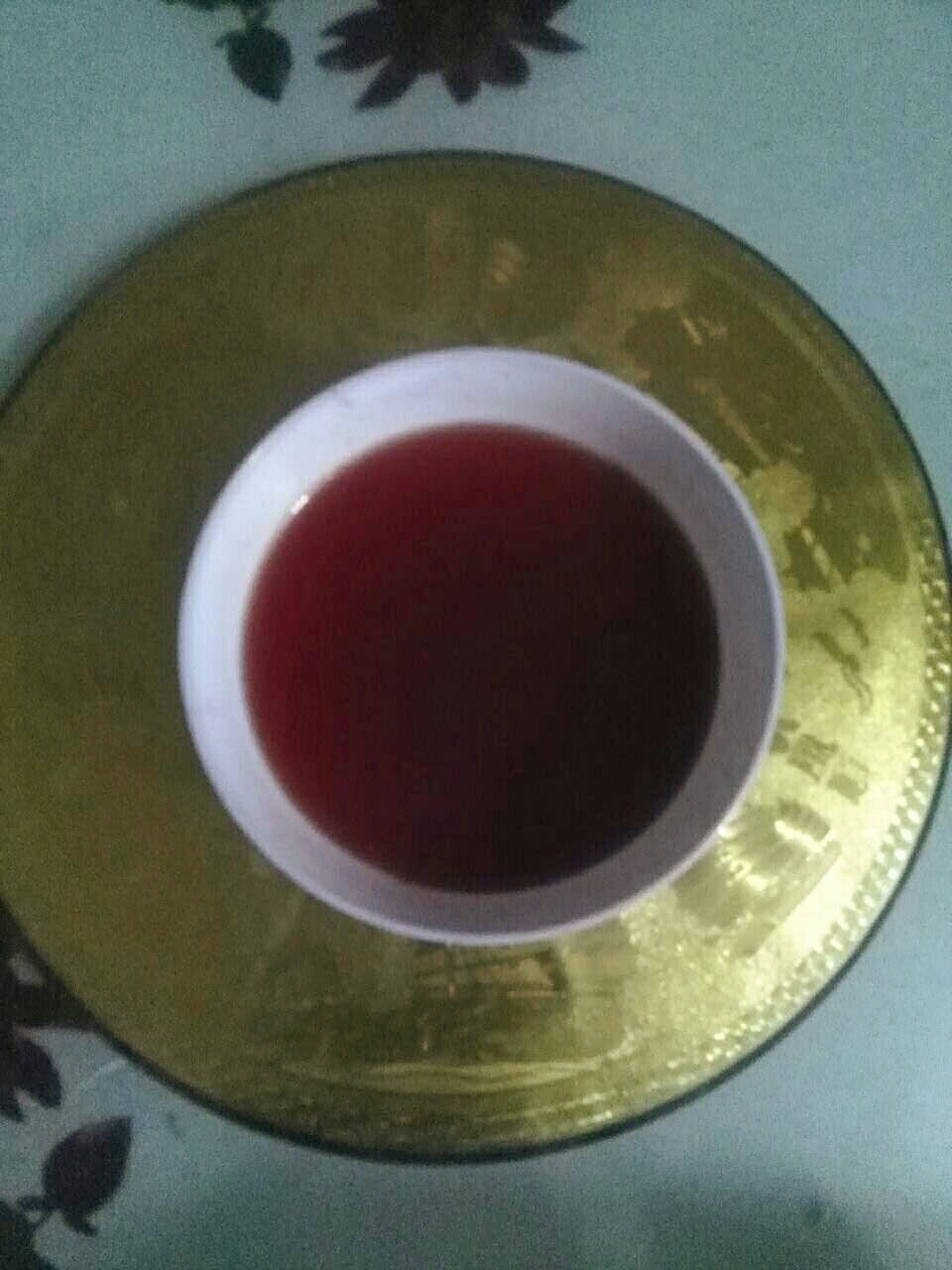
- Hakka mother wine
- Simplified Chinese: 客家黃酒
- Traditional Chinese: 客家黃酒
Transcriptions
Standard Mandarin
- Hanyu Pinyin: Kèjiā Huángjiǔ
Yue: Cantonese
- Jyutping: haak3 gaa1 wong4 zau2

Mother wine
- Chinese: 家娘酒
Transcriptions
Standard Mandarin
- Hanyu Pinyin: Jiāniáng jiǔ
Yue: Cantonese
- Jyutping: gaa1 noeng4 zau2

Hakka rice wine (Chinese: 客家黄酒) is a type of rice wine in Hakka cuisine. It is also known as niang wine, or mother wine (Chinese: 家娘酒), due to being produced domestically by Hakka women. It is mainly found in the Hakka city of Meizhou, Guangdong.

Hakka wine is often served as a treat for guests during festivals. New mothers are also encouraged to consume it to aid recovery in the postpartum period.

== Folklore ==
According to custom, Hakka wine was made by a God. During the period of Barbarians' Invasion of China from 304 AD to 439 AD, the Hakka people immigrated to the South of China. However, they were exhausted due to the long distances. The god in his mercy taught them the methods of brewing the wine as refreshment. Hakka ancestors regarded the mother liquor with special medical effects as treasure and passed it on from generation to generation.

== Method of production ==
In the Hakka areas, the methods of traditional Hakka rice wine not only still spreads in the hands of some housewives, but also forms a standard production process in industry:

1. Selection of main raw materials: glutinous rice, Hongqu(red yeast rice) and water.
2. Macerating rice. Water should be poured into a big round urn before rice and then stirred to make them mix evenly.
3. Steamed rice. In general, an appropriate requirement of steamed rice features softness, transparency, and no agglomeration.
4. Cooling. To cool the steamed rice until the temperature drops to the degrees from 30 to 35.
5. Fermentation. Put Hongqu into the cooling steamed rice, add water, stir evenly, and seal for fermentation. The fermentation temperature is controlled between 20 and 30 degrees and the time lasts about 7 days.

== Mother wine chicken ==
Mother wine chicken
- Simplified Chinese: 家娘鸡
- Traditional Chinese: 家娘雞
Transcriptions
Standard Mandarin
- Hanyu Pinyin: Jiāniángjī
Yue: Cantonese
- Jyutping: gaa1 noeng4 gai1

Mother wine chicken (Chinese: 娘酒鸡, 娘酒雞), also known as ginger wine chicken or wine fried chicken, is a traditional Hakka relishing dish eaten in winter, made with ginger, chicken and rice wine. To start with, minced ginger and chopped chicken are fried together, and then with a moderate amount of glutinous rice wine boiled.

The dish usually appears at important occasions, such as in a Hakka family reunion, and the Spring Festival, where it is consumed by people of all ages and genders. According to traditional Chinese medicine, it is believed to promote blood circulation and dispel the wind [It is warm in nature and dispels cold and dampness. ], and is used as a nutritional supplement for women who have just given birth.
