= Hariya =

Type of beer

Hariya is a beer, originating from Northeast India, made from rice.

== Description ==
Hariya is mainly prepared and drunk by the Santhal and Munda people, Oraw People living in Bangladesh and tribal peoples of the West Bengal, Assam, Jharkhand, Odisha, Chhattisgarh, and Madhya Pradesh states of India. Bakhars (a kind of cookie made with wheat flour, herbs and yeast) are then mixed with boiled rice and left to ferment. The fermentation is complete within 2-3 days, and the resultant hariya is served cool in a leaf-hewn pot. "Hariya" has a lower alcohol percentage by volume than other Indian country liquors.

== See also ==
- Rice beer
