= Rượu cần =

Fermented rice wine

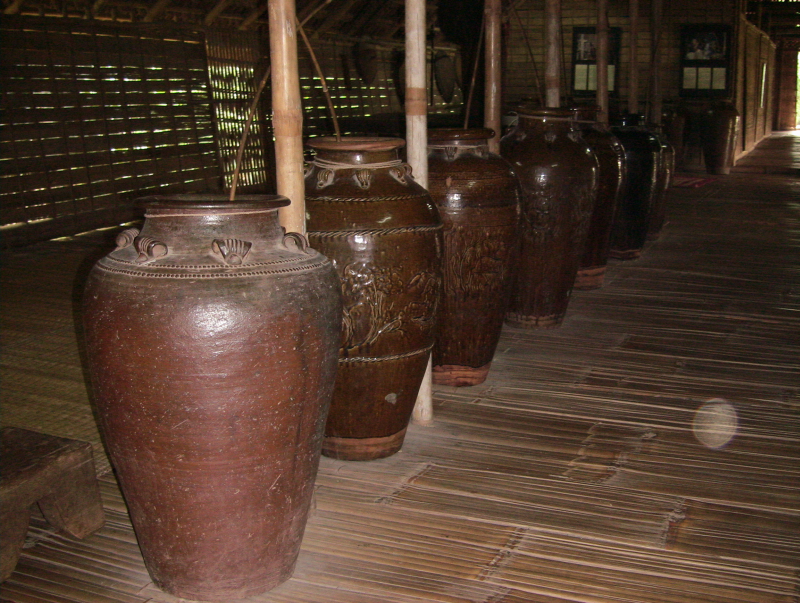
Rượu cần jars in a nhà dài (longhouse) of the Êđê ethnic people in Tây Nguyên.

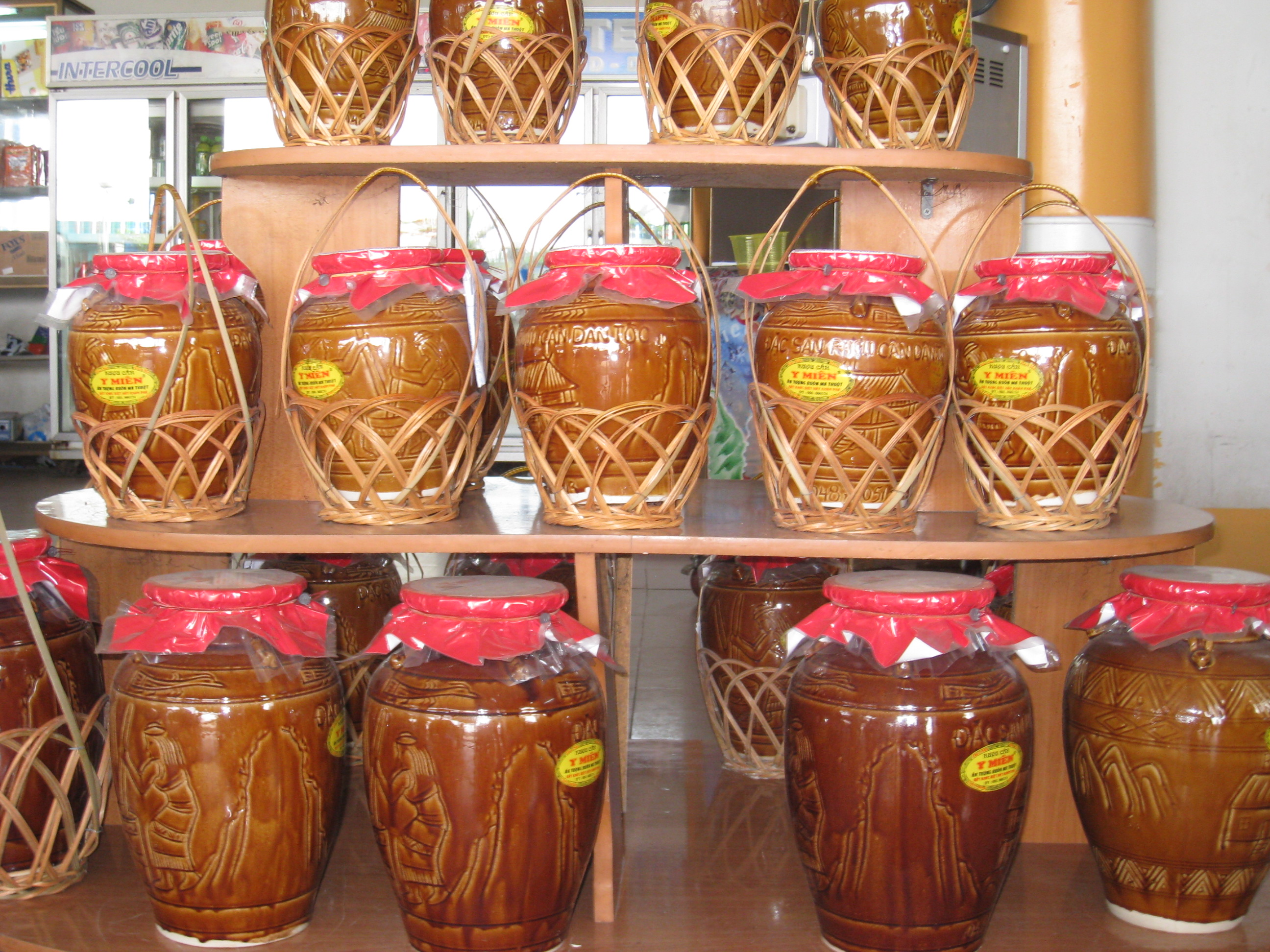
Earthenware jars of rượu cần in a shop in Vũng Tàu city.

Rượu cần (Vietnamese pronunciation: [ʐɯəw˨˩ʔ kɤ̆n˨˩], lit. 'stem liquor' or 'straw liquor') is a fermented rice wine indigenous to several ethnic groups in Vietnam, in areas such as Tây Nguyên or Tây Bắc. It is made of fermented glutinous rice (nếp) mixed with several kinds of herbs (including leaves and roots) from the local forests. The types and amount of herbs added differ according to ethnic group and region. This mixture is then put into a large earthenware jug, covered, and allowed to ferment for at least one month. Rượu cần's strength is typically 15 to 25 percent alcohol by volume.

Rượu cần is generally consumed by placing long, slender cane tubes in the jar, through which the wine is drunk. Often two or more people (and sometimes up to ten or more) will drink together from the same jug communally, each using a separate tube.

== Varieties ==
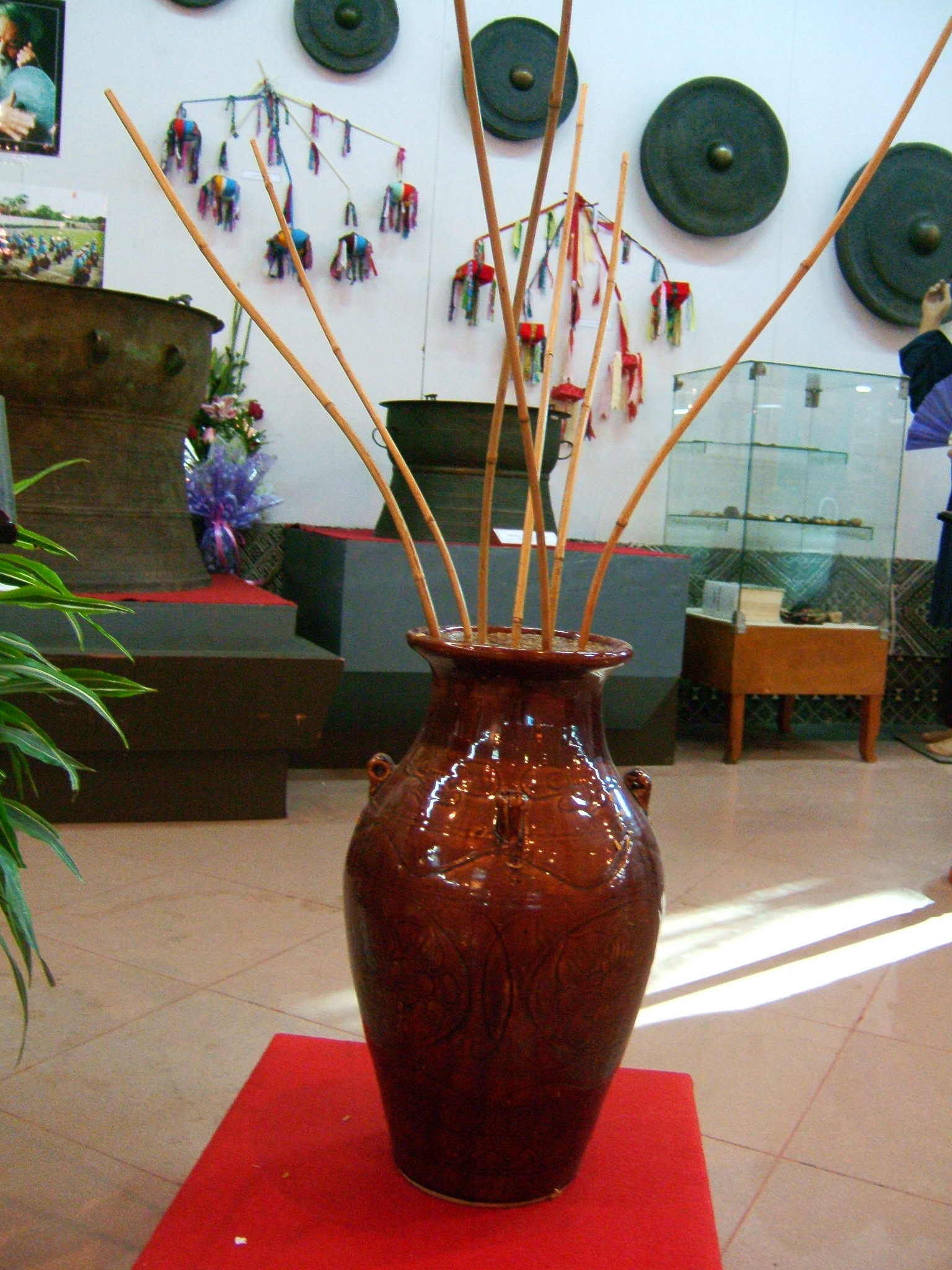
Rượu cần of the Mường people

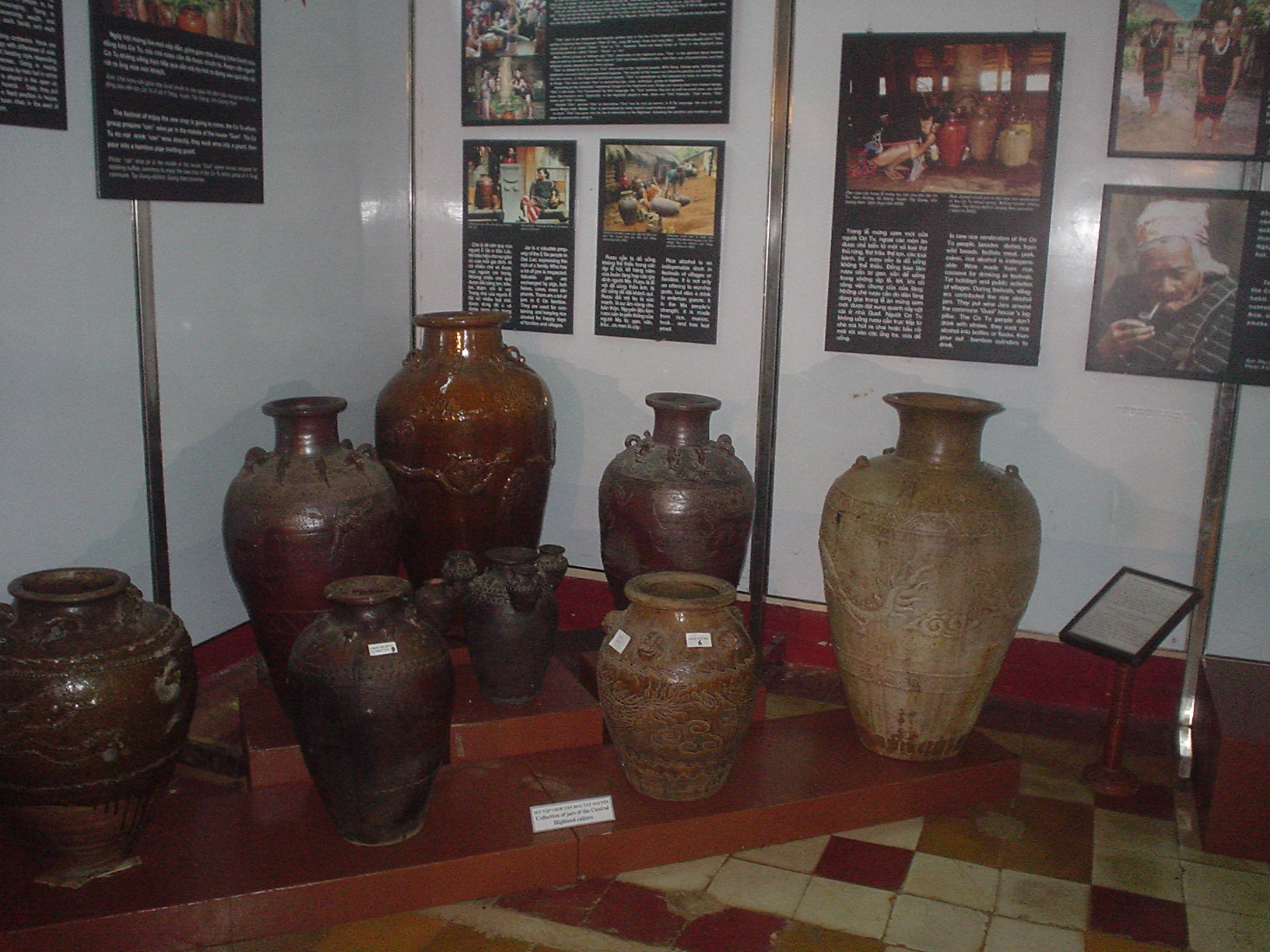
Rượu cần of the Montagnard people

In Montagnard culture, Rượu cần is typically drunk for special occasions such as festivals, weddings, or harvest feasts. It is often consumed by a fire or in a nhà rông, or community house. People almost always dance and play gong music after drinking. When a guest is invited to drink rượu cần by the local people, it means that this he/she is seen as a distinguished guest.

K'ho people in Lâm Đồng have an elaborate rượu cần ritual. K'ho people brew their rice wine with herbs such as the Me kà zút. Liquor jars were considered as lodge of the wine god (Yang Ter Nerm). Vintage jars are highly prized.

Tai and Muong people also consume rượu cần.

== See also ==
- Cơm rượu
- Lao-Lao, a similar wine drunk in Laos
- Sra peang, a similar wine drunk in Cambodia
- Rice wine
- Rượu nếp
- Rượu thuốc
- Rượu đế
