= Zutho =

Alcoholic beverage of Naga origin

- Type: Rice wine
- Origin: India, Nagaland
- Introduced: Naga people
- Alcohol by volume: 5%
- Color: White
- Ingredients: Glutinous rice
- Related products: Judima, thuthse, Choujiu

Zutho is a fermented drink, originating from the Indian state of Nagaland, obtained from rice. It is a traditional drink of the Angami and Chakhesang Nagas and is commonly consumed by all Nagas in both urban and rural regions of Nagaland.

It contains approximately 5%(v/v) of ethanol, and is known for its fruity odor, which is partly imparted by the acetyl esters in generous amounts. It is often compared to other Asian Rice Wines, like the Japanese sake in terms of production methods and mild alcoholic strength. Traditionally zutho is prepared by allowing starch-rich solutions to broken down by enzymes into sugars that are fermented by yeast. Starch in rice has to be made into malt by sprouting, or digested by enzymes that Nagas learned to grow in a separate process on a plant.

== See also ==
- Choujiu—Chinese equivalent of Zutho
- Makgeolli—Korean equivalent of Zutho
- Nigori—Japanese equivalent of Zutho
- Thuthse
- Naga cuisine
