= Rượu nếp =

Rice-based pudding or drink from Vietnam

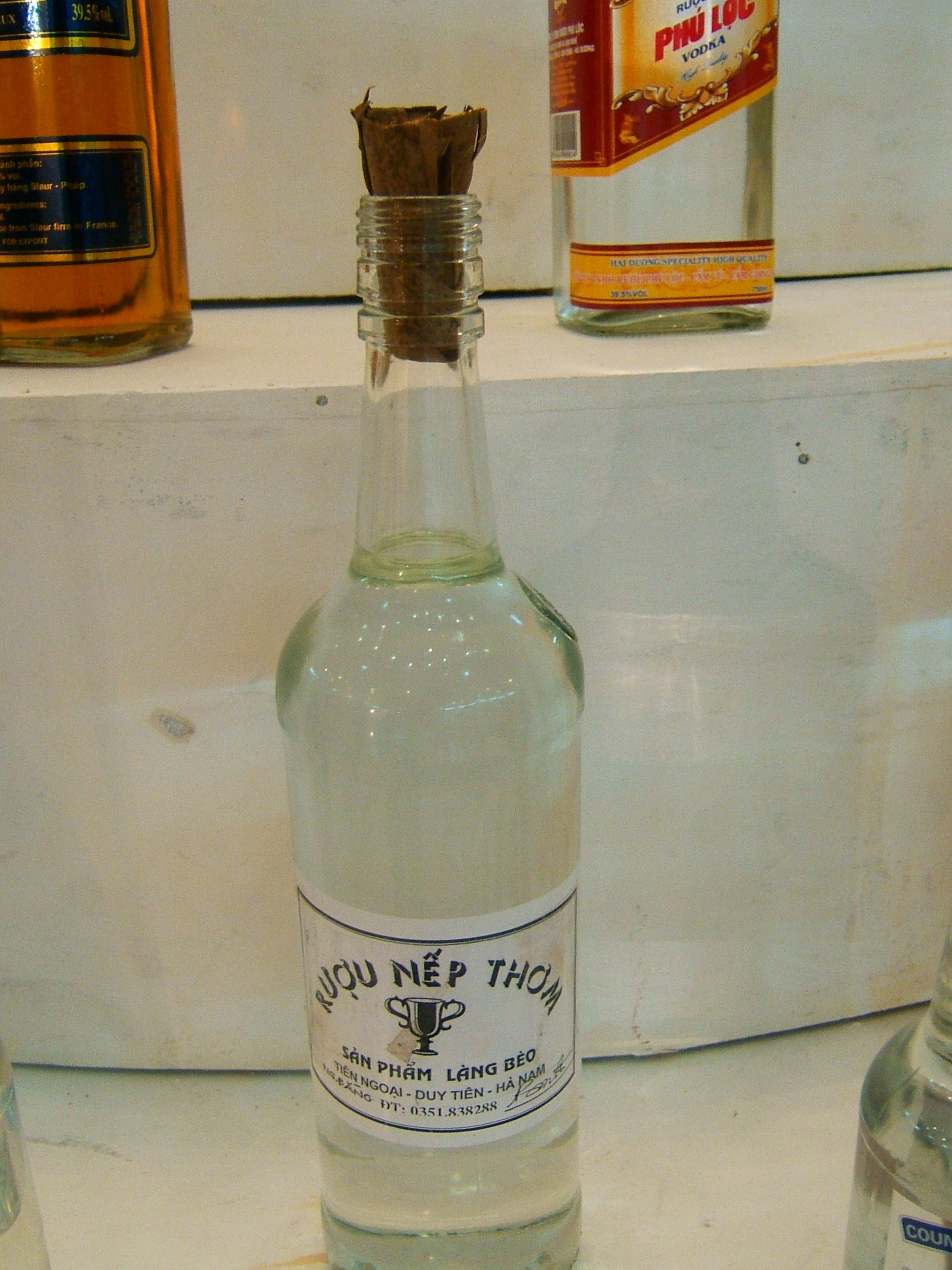
- A bottle of rượu nếp
- Type: Rice pudding
- Course: Snack
- Place of origin: Vietnam
- Region or state: Southeast Asia
- Main ingredients: Glutinous rice, yeast

Rượu nếp (sometimes also called rượu nếp bắc, lit. 'northern glutinous rice wine' or rượu nếp cẩm, lit. 'black glutinous rice wine') is a pudding or drink from northern Vietnam.

== Preparation ==
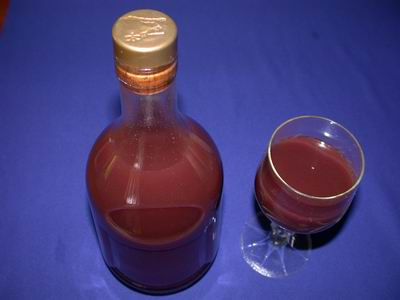
Rượu nếp than

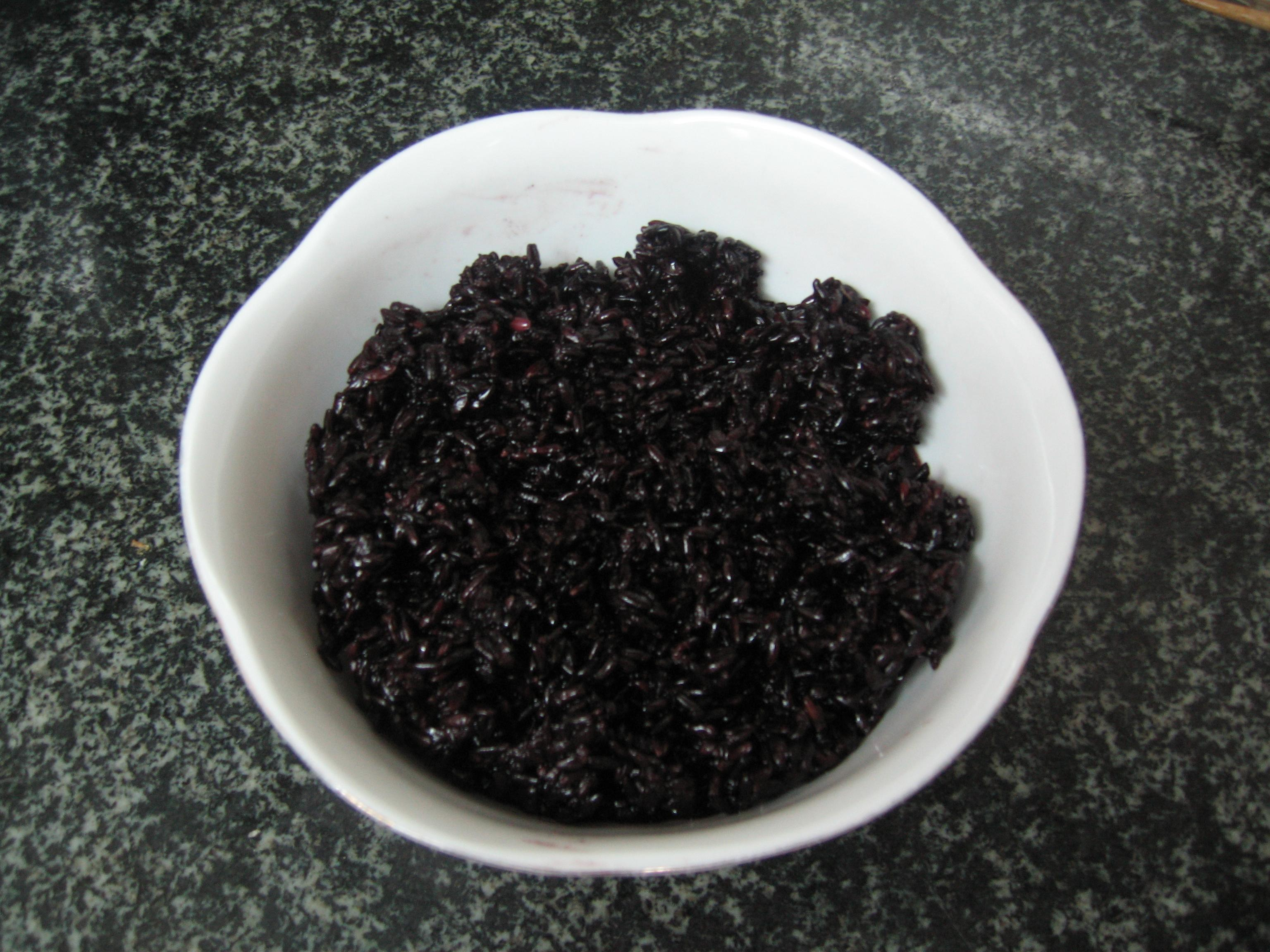
Rượu nếp cẩm

It is made from glutinous rice that has been fermented with the aid of yeast and steamed in a banana leaf. It may be either deep purplish-red or yellow in color depending on the variety of rice used. Rượu nếp is mildly alcoholic (rượu is the word for "alcohol" in Vietnamese). Depending on its consistency, it may be considered either a pudding or a wine. Thicker versions are eaten with a spoon, while more liquid varieties may be drunk as a beverage. Rượu nếp than is a brown-colored rice wine.

Many Vietnamese people regard rượu nếp as a healthful food, and believe that it wards off or kills parasites.

Although they are most typical of northern Vietnam, rượu nếp and rượu nếp than are available in Ho Chi Minh City, at the market near the residential quarter where northern Vietnamese people live.

== Varieties ==
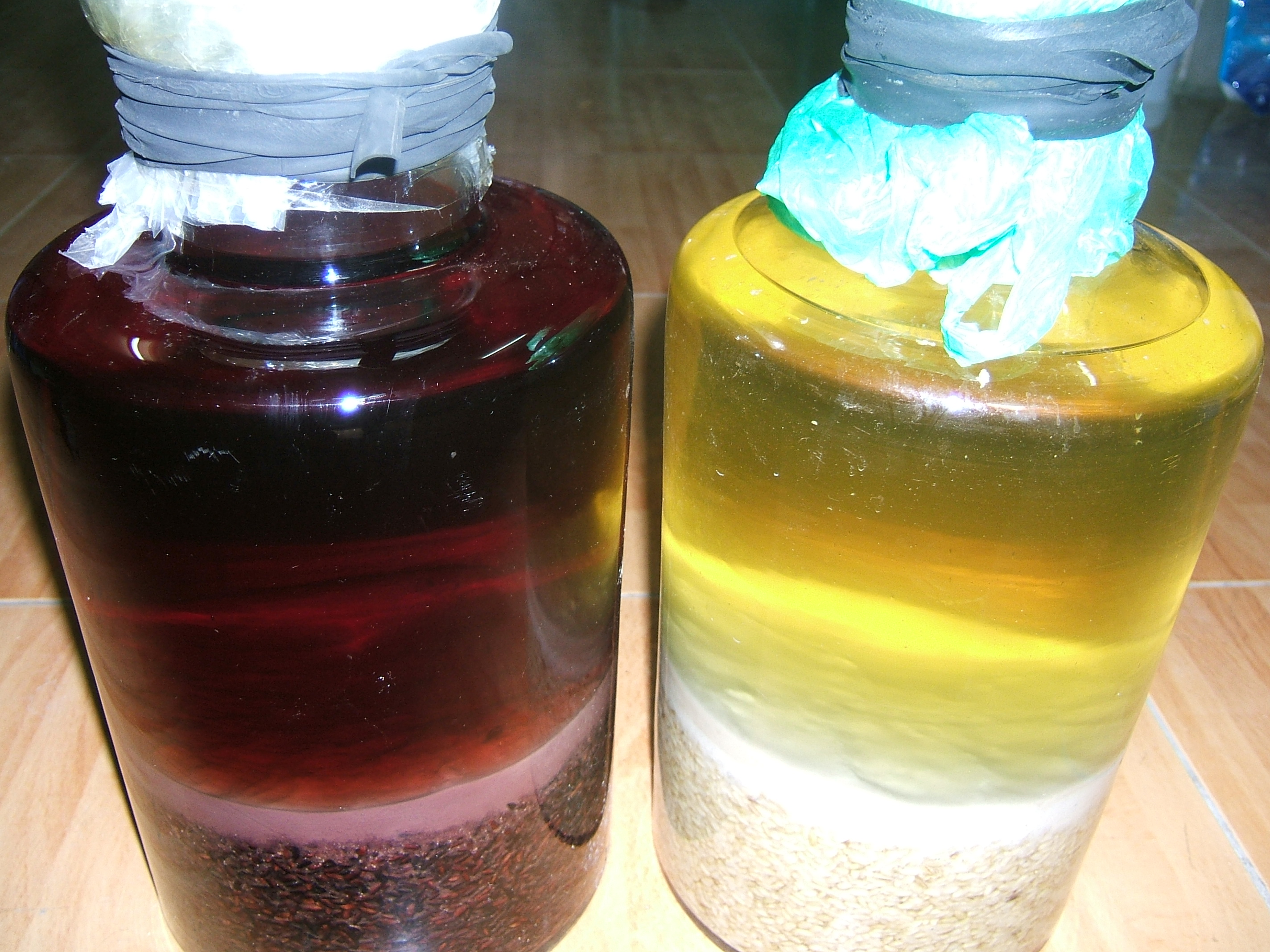
Pickled rượu nếp with cơm rượu nếp cẩm and nếp cái

In Vietnam's Central Highlands, a similar rice wine, rượu cần (literally "stem wine" or "tube wine"), is drunk in a communal manner, through long reed straws out of large earthenware jugs. Rượu cần may be made out of ordinary rice, glutinous rice, cassava, or corn, along with leaves and herbs. Yet another variety of minority rice wine is rượu nếp nương, made from a glutinous rice grown in mountainous cultivation areas of Vietnam's northwest.

A similar dish, from southern Vietnam, is called cơm rượu, and consists of balls made from white glutinous rice in a mildly alcoholic rice wine.

== See also ==
- Cuisine of Vietnam
- Cơm rượu
- Rượu cần
- Rượu đế
- Rượu thuốc
- Rice wine
- Vietnamese wine
- Northern and southern Vietnam § Cuisine
