= Sudo Honke =

Japanese sake manufacturer

Sudo Honke, Inc.
- Native name: 須藤 本家
- Industry: Alcohol
- Founded: 1141
- Founder: Sudo Honke
- Headquarters: 2215 Obara, Kasama, Ibaraki-ken, Japan
- Key people: Yoshiyasu Sudo (President)
- Products: Sake
- Owner: Sudo family
- Website: www.sudohonke.co.jp/en/

Sudo Honke (須藤 本家, Sudō Honke) is a Japanese manufacturer of sake headquartered in Kasama, Ibaraki Prefecture. Founded in 1141, and run by the 55th generation of the Sudo family, it is the oldest sake brewery in Japan and one of the oldest companies in the world.

Although it was undamaged by the 2011 Tōhoku earthquake and tsunami, the brewery was threatened by the subsequent nuclear disaster at the Fukushima I Nuclear Power Plant, located approximately 130 km from the brewery. Subsequent tests confirmed no radiation had entered its centuries-old source wells.
