= Rượu đế =

Distilled liquor from Vietnam

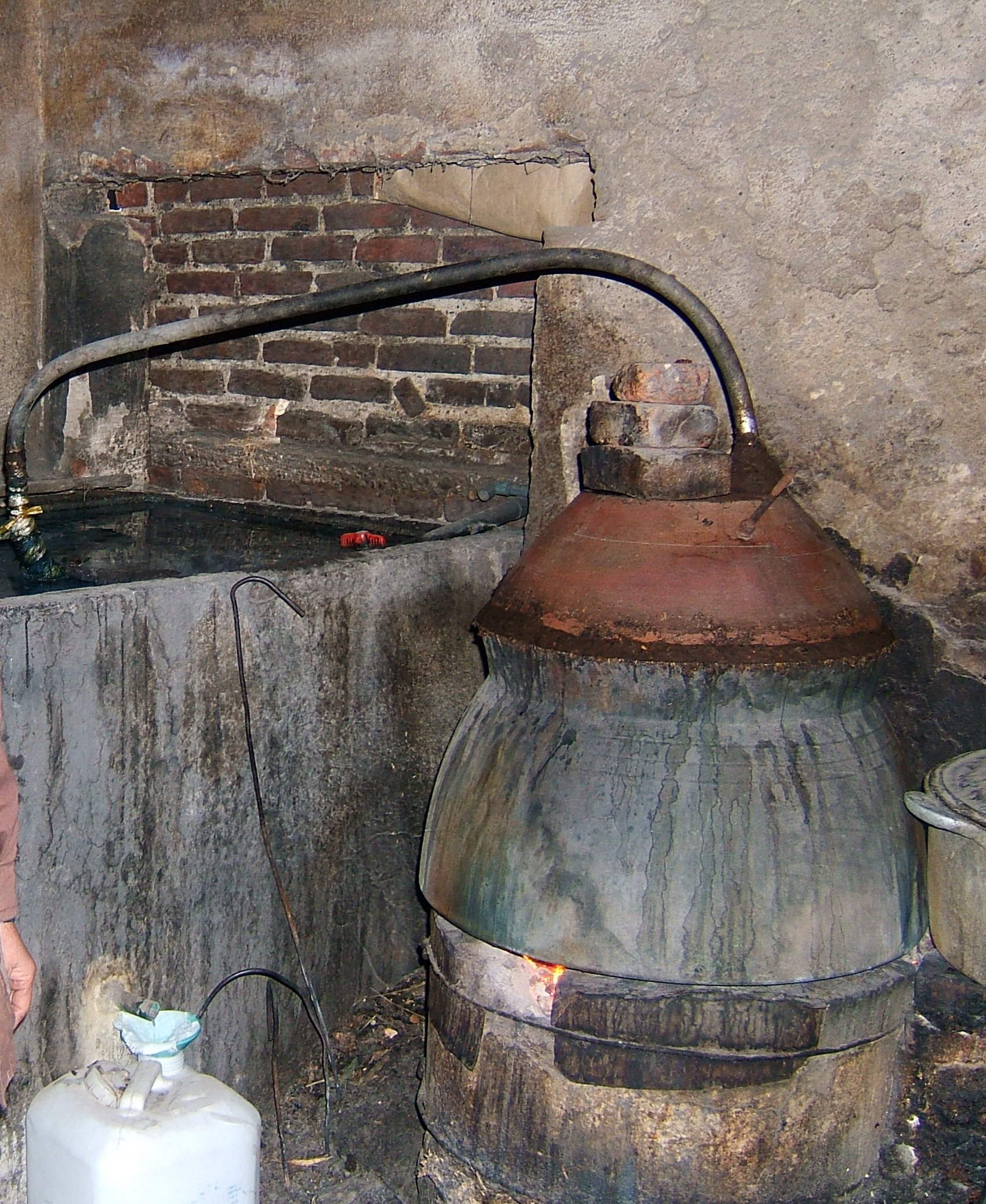
A rượu đế still

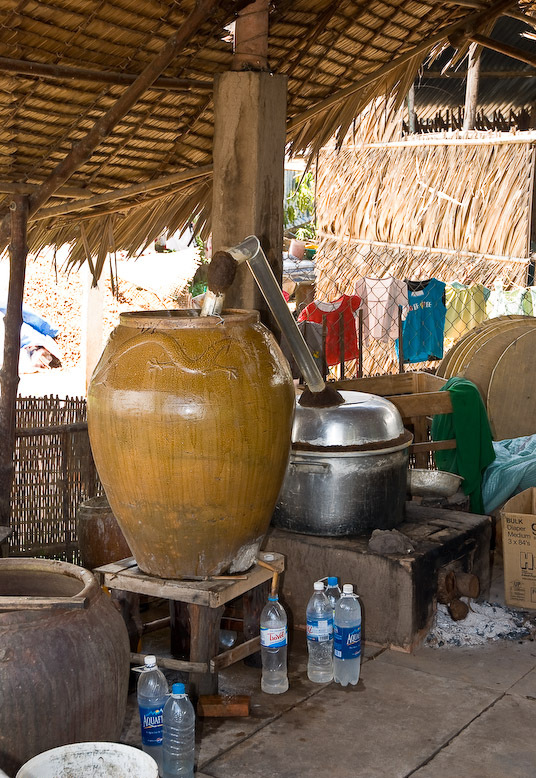
Distilling rượu đế in the Mekong Delta

Rượu đế is a distilled liquor from Vietnam, made of either glutinous or non-glutinous rice. It was formerly made illegally and is thus similar to moonshine. It is popular in the Mekong Delta region of southwestern Vietnam (its equivalent in northern Vietnam is called rượu quốc lủi). Its strength varies, but is typically 40 percent alcohol by volume. It is usually clear, and a bit cloudy in appearance.

== Etymology ==
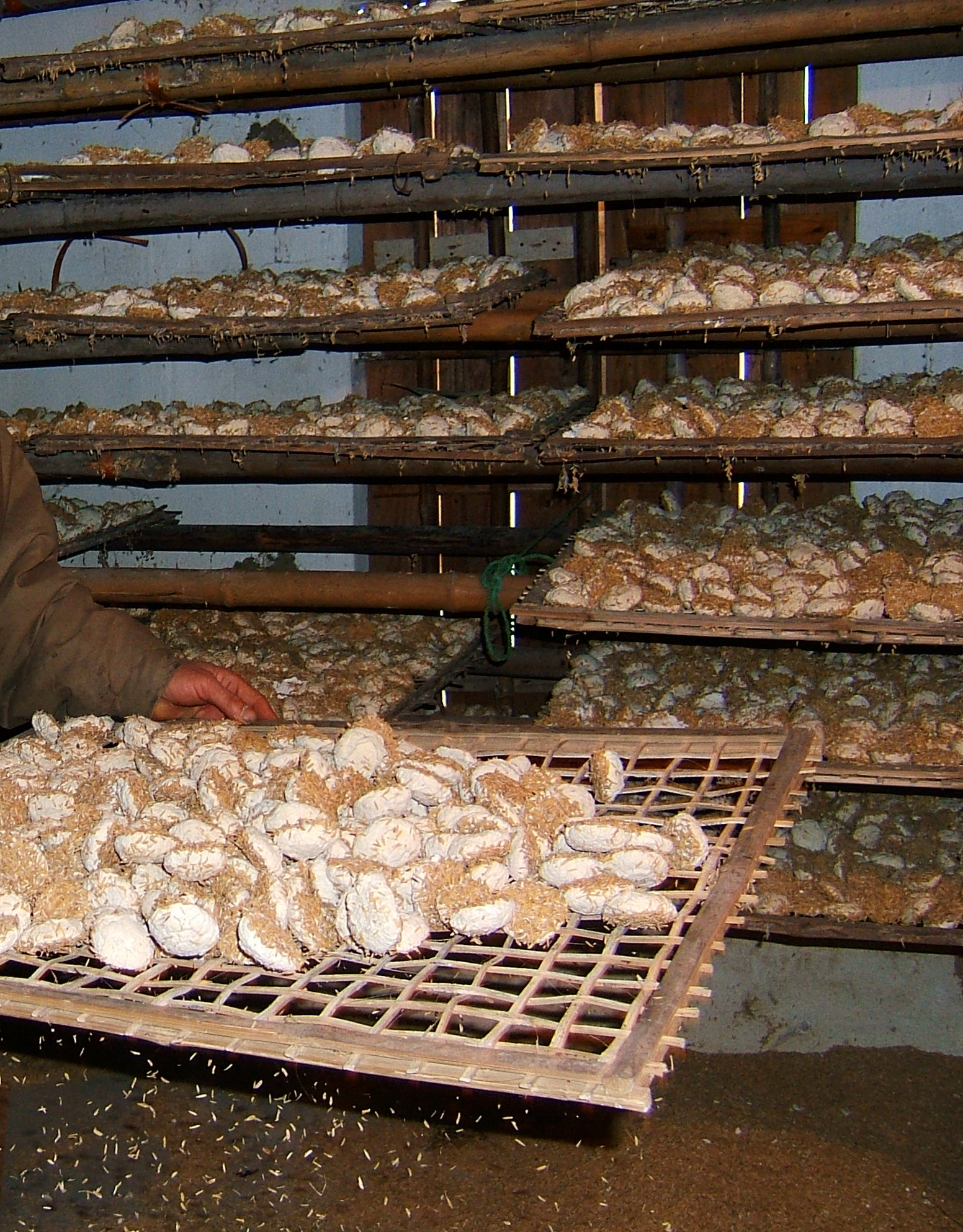
Men rượu - ingredients for making Rượu đế

The term rượu đế literally means "đế (Kans grass) liquor." This name is explained by the fact that in Cochinchina (southern Vietnam) during the early period of French colonization, the imperialist government had a monopoly on alcohol production, and the only distilled alcoholic beverage the general population could legally purchase was rượu Công Ty (literally "Company alcohol"; also known as rượu Ty). Those who paid a special fee were given a sign emblazoned with the letters "RA" (an abbreviation for "Régie d'Alcool") to hang in front of their store, which gave them the privilege to be able to sell alcohol from the Société Française des Distilleries de l'Indochine, which was a diluted, distilled alcoholic beverage made from rice and corn. In order to obtain liquor with a higher proof, many people resorted to distilling their own liquor in secret by hiding it in tall grass called cỏ tranh (Imperata cylindrica), or in another kind of grass called đế (Kans grass, which grows up to three meters tall), far away from their homes. A number of separate inspection organizations directly commanded by the French were established to specifically punish households that made alcohol without a license, which the Vietnamese often called "Tây đoan" or "Tàu cáo" (a type of tax inspector). Whenever such individuals saw the tax collector, they would bring their alcohol and hide it in a field overgrown with đế plants.

Rượu đế is sometimes referred to as rượu lậu, literally "contraband liquor", although this term may also refer to other varieties of illegally produced Vietnamese liquor or rice wine.

While the term rượu đế is used most often in southern Vietnam, such liquor is typically called rượu quốc lủi in northern Vietnam. Although the exact etymology of the latter term is unclear, its component words translate literally as follows: rượu=liquor; quốc=nation, state; and lủi=to slip away. There are several theories of the origin of this term. The first proposes that it is a corruption of rượu cuốc lủi (literally "swamphen slips away liquor"), as cuốc (Porphyrio, a type of swamphen) and quốc are homophones; this term may have come about because those who produce and sell this form of liquor have to do it in fear of prosecution, selling and then slipping away, like the behavior of the cuốc bird. The second theory is that the term is a parody of the foreign term "national spirit" (literally translated as quốc hồn quốc túy, but can be understood to refer to a type of liquor), because the "national spirit" has to be produced surreptitiously, it is thus called rượu quốc lủi. The third theory states that the term was created to distinguish this liquor from rượu quốc doanh (literally "state enterprise alcohol"); the government in northern Vietnam under communist rule prior to đổi mới in 1986 had a monopoly on liquor production, so this illegally produced alcohol is similar to American moonshine—again highlighting the theme of secrecy.

== See also ==
- Cơm rượu
- Rice baijiu
- Rice wine
- Rượu nếp
- Rượu thuốc
- Rượu cần
- Shōchū
- Vietnamese wine
- Vietnamese Wikipedia Category: Vietnamese alcoholic beverages

== Bibliography ==
- Lê Tân (2003). Văn hóa ẩm thực ở Trà Vinh. NXB: Văn hóa Thông tin, H.2003, p. 78.
