= Rice wine =

Alcoholic beverage made from fermented rice

Traditional way to making rice wine from fermented rice

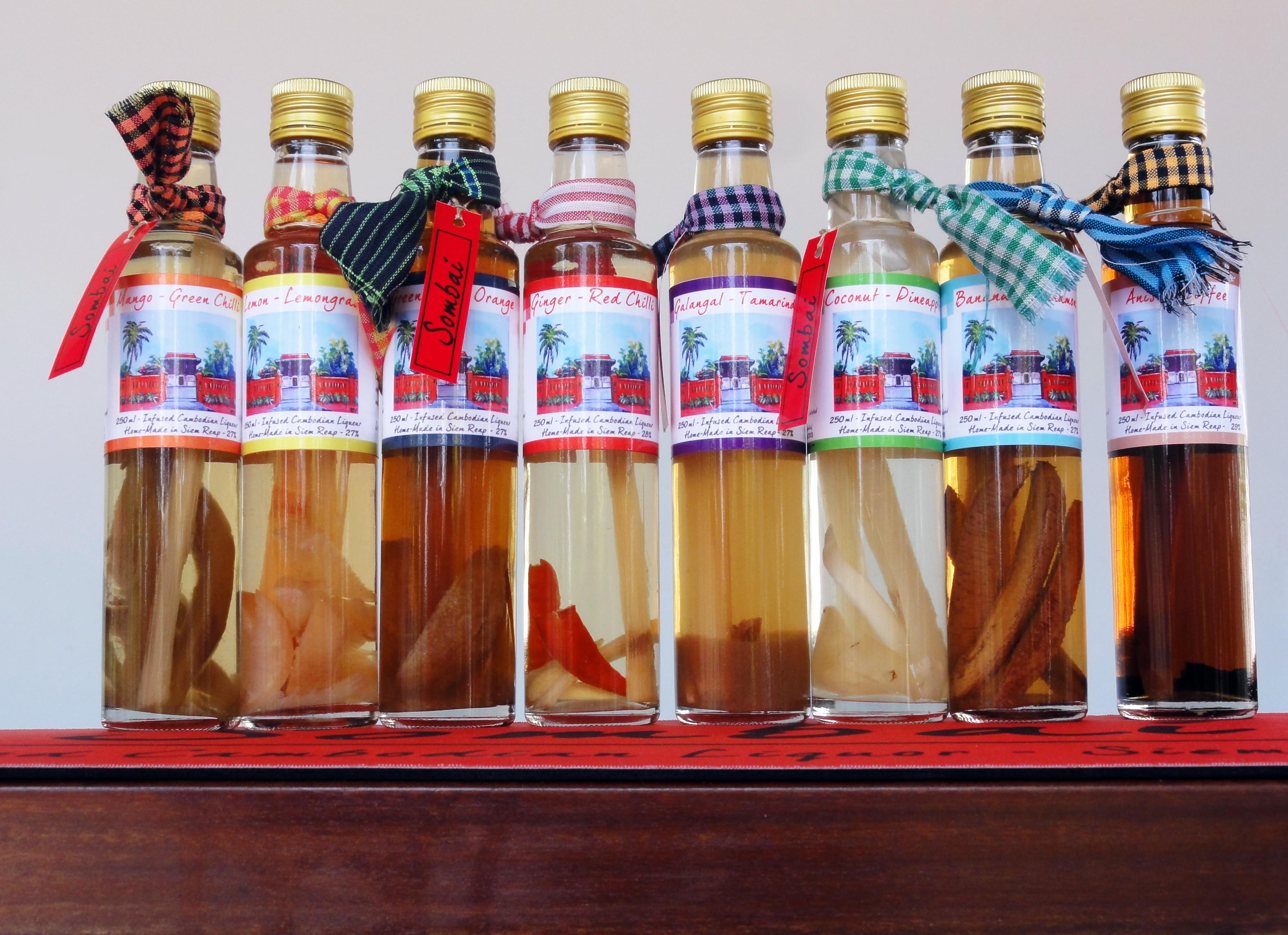
Bottles of Sombai Cambodian infused rice wines

Rice wine is an alcoholic beverage fermented from rice, traditionally consumed in East Asia, Southeast Asia and South Asia, where rice is a quintessential staple crop. Rice wine is made by the fermentation of rice starch, during which microbes enzymatically convert polysaccharides to sugar and then to ethanol. The Chinese mijiu (most famous being huangjiu), Japanese sake, and Korean cheongju, dansul and takju are some of the most notable types of rice wine.

Rice wine typically has an alcohol content of 10–25% ABV, and is typically served warm. One panel of taste testers arrived at 60 °C (140 °F) as an optimum serving temperature. Rice wines are drunk as a dining beverage in East Asian, Southeast Asian and South Asian cuisine during formal dinners and banquets, and are also used as cooking wines to add flavors or to neutralize unwanted tastes in certain food items (e.g. seafood such as fish and shellfish).

== History ==
The production of rice wine has thousands of years of history. In ancient China, rice wine was the primary alcoholic drink. Rice wine is one of the oldest fermented beverages, with the oldest evidence of rice wine being a rice and honey drink found in central China about 9,000 years ago. In the Shang Dynasty (1750-1100 BCE), funerary objects routinely featured wine vessels. The production of rice wine in Japan is believed to have started around third century BCE, after the introduction of wet rice cultivation.

As a result of Alexander the Great's expedition to India, the Roman Empire had begun importing rice wine by the first century BCE.

== Production ==
Despite being called a wine, the rice wine's production process has some similarities to that of brewing beer, reflecting its chief ingredient being a grain rather than a fruit. The specific approaches to making rice wine vary by type. Some rice wine (such as the Chinese rice wine, or mijiu) is made from glutinous rice, while others (such as the Japanese Sake) is made from non-glutinous rice. However, all systems combine rice with some fungal culture in some ways. The fungal culture is called jiuqu in Chinese and koji in Japanese. In the traditional Chinese rice-wine-making approach, the glutinous rice is soaked for several days before being steamed, and subsequently is left to cool in a ceramic vat at near room temperature. Then, the jiuqu is added and mixed with the rice. The primary functions of jiuqu are to supply enzymes to convert starch to sugar and to supply yeast for ethanol production. After a few days, the liquid formed in the ceramic vat is combined with an additional mix of water and fungi to adjust the rice wine's water content.

== Types ==
Name	Place of origin	Region of origin	Description
Agkud	Philippines	Southeast Asia	Fermented rice paste or rice wine of the Manobo people from Bukidnon
Apong	India	South Asia	Indigenous to the Mising tribe, an indigenous Assamese community from the northeastern states of Assam and Arunachal Pradesh
Ara	Bhutan	South Asia	Also made with millet, or maize
Beopju	Korea	East Asia	A variety of cheongju
Brem	Bali, Indonesia	Southeast Asia	Made from glutinous rice.
Cơm rượu	Vietnam	Southeast Asia	Made from glutinous rice.
Cheongju	Korea	East Asia	Clear; refined
Cholai	West Bengal, India	South Asia	Reddish
Choujiu	Xi'an, Shaanxi, China	East Asia	A milky wine made with glutinous rice
Chuak	India	South Asia	Milky rice wine from Tripura, India
Chhaang	Nepal, India, Bhutan	South Asia	Milky rice wine from Nepal, Northeast India, Bhutan
Dansul	Korea	East Asia	Milky; sweet
Gwaha-ju	Korea	East Asia	Fortified
Hakka	Meizhou, Guangdong, China	East Asia	Made from red yeast rice and glutinous rice
Hariya	India	South Asia	White; watery
Handia	India	South Asia	White; watery, from Chhattisgarh, Jharkhand, Odisha, Uttar Pradesh and Bihar, India
Hanji	India	South Asia	Native to Chakma community living in India, Myanmar, Bangladesh. It is a fermented wine made from rice and apparently is white in colour. And is majorly consumed during festive season.
Huangjiu	China	East Asia	Fermented, literally "yellow wine" or "yellow liquor", with colors varying from clear to brown or brownish red
Judima	India	South Asia	Fermented, distinguished by the use of a local wild herb called thembra
Langkau	Borneo, Malaysia (Sarawak)	Southeast Asia	Traditional rice wine of the indigenous Iban and Dayak derived from the tuak.
Lao-Lao	Laos	Southeast Asia	Clear
Lihing	Borneo, Malaysia (Sabah)	Southeast Asia	Traditional rice wine of the indigenous Kadazan-Dusun usually served during festive including Kaamatan. Produced through a rice fermentation process using glutinous rice with natural yeast, fermentation takes two to three months to produce a drink with a higher alcohol content.
Laopani (Xaaj)	India	South Asia	Made from fermented rice; popular in Assam. Concentrated (pale yellow coloured extract) of the same is called Rohi
Lugdi	India	South Asia	Milky rice wine from Himachal Pradesh, India
Makgeolli	Korea	East Asia	Milky
Mijiu	China	East Asia	A clear, sweet liqueur made from fermented glutinous rice
Mirin	Japan	East Asia	Used in cooking
Montoku	Borneo, Malaysia (Sabah)	Southeast Asia	Traditional rice wine of the indigenous Kadazan-Dusun and Rungus derived from either the lihing or tapai where the collected steam is channelled into a container.
Pangasi	Philippines	Southeast Asia	Rice wines with ginger from the Visayas and Mindanao islands of the Philippines. Sometimes made with job's tears or cassava.
Phú Lộc rice wine	Vietnam	Southeast Asia	The spirit is made from sticky rice fermented with a traditional strain of yeast.
Rượu cần	Vietnam	Southeast Asia	Drunk through long, thin bamboo tubes.
Rượu nếp	Vietnam	Southeast Asia	Mildly alcoholic Vietnamese pudding or wine made from fermented glutinous rice.
Rượu đế	Vietnam	Southeast Asia	Made of either glutinous or non-glutinous rice.
Sake	Japan	East Asia	The term "sake", in Japanese, literally means "alcohol", and the Japanese rice wine is usually termed nihonshu (日本酒; "Japanese liquor") in Japan. It is the most widely known type of rice wine in North America because of its ubiquitous appearance in Japanese restaurants.
Sato	Northeast Thailand	Southeast Asia	Sato is a traditional northeastern Thailand (Isan) alcoholic fermented drink that has been made for centuries from starchy glutinous or sticky rice by growers in that region.
Shaoxing	Shaoxing, Zhejiang, China	East Asia	One of the most famous varieties of huangjiu, or traditional Chinese wines
Sra peang	Northeastern Cambodia	Southeast Asia	Cloudy white rice wine indigenous to several ethnic groups in Northeastern Cambodia (Mondulkiri and Ratanakiri).
Sulai	India	South Asia	Rice wine from Assam region
Sonti	India	South Asia	Andhra Pradesh, Telangana
Sunda Kanji	India	South Asia	Rice wine from Tamil Nadu
Tapai	Borneo, Malaysia (Sabah)	Southeast Asia	Traditional rice wine among the Bornean indigenous ethnics of Kadazan-Dusun, Murut, Paitan, and Rungus.
Tapuy	Philippines	Southeast Asia	Also called baya or tapey. Clear rice wine from Banaue and Mountain Province in the Philippines
Tuak	Borneo (Brunei, Indonesia (Kalimantan), and Malaysia (Sarawak))	Southeast Asia	Traditional rice wine of the indigenous Iban and Dayak people in Brunei, Kalimantan of Indonesia and Sarawak of Malaysia.
Leiyi, Zam, Khar, Paso and Chathur	India	South Asia	Varieties of wine and beer from Manipur region
Zutho	India	South Asia	Rice wine from Nagaland
Zu	India	South Asia	Rice wine from Mizoram

== See also ==
- Beer
- Chinese alcoholic beverages
- Korean alcoholic beverages
- Rice vinegar
- Rice wine cup
