= Choujiu =

Chinese fermented rice beverage

- Chinese: 稠酒
Transcriptions
Standard Mandarin
- Hanyu Pinyin: chóujiǔ

Choujiu is a type of Chinese fermented alcoholic beverage brewed from glutinous rice. It is very thick and has a milky white color, which is sometimes compared to jade.^{photo} Fermentation is carried out by a combination of the fungus Aspergillus oryzae, which converts the rice starches into fermentable sugars, and yeast, which converts the sugars into alcohol. Varieties of lactic acid bacteria are also commonly present in the fermentation starter. The traditional Chinese name of the fermentation starter is qū.

Choujiu is an ancient variety of Chinese alcoholic beverage. It can be traced back to the Tang dynasty, where it was praised by the poet Li Bai. In ancient times, choujiu was referred to as láolǐ (醪醴) or yùjiāng (玉浆).

In the modern day, the city of Xi'an is known particularly for its choujiu.

Doburoku (どぶろく / 濁酒) is the Japanese equivalent of choujiu, and in Korea gamju and makgeolli are similar.

== See also ==
- Chinese alcohol
- Doburoku
- Amazake
- Gamju
- Makgeolli – Korean equivalent of Choujiu
- Nigori – Japanese equivalent of Choujiu
- Zutho – Naga equivalent of Choujiu
