= Cơm rượu =

Vietnamese dessert made from glutinous rice

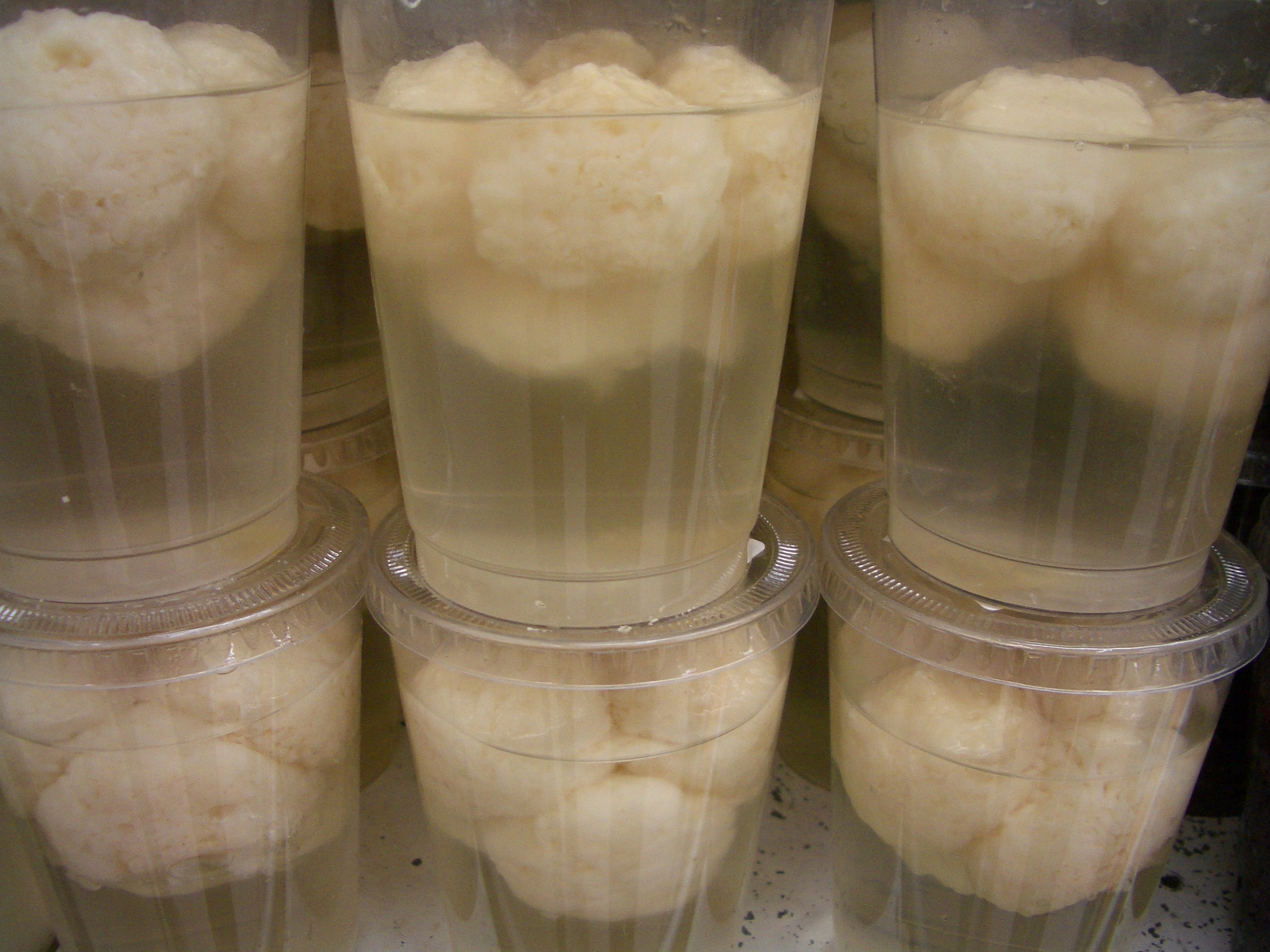
- Plastic containers of cơm rượu
- Type: Rice pudding
- Course: Dessert
- Place of origin: Vietnam
- Region or state: Southern Vietnam
- Main ingredients: Glutinous rice, yeast

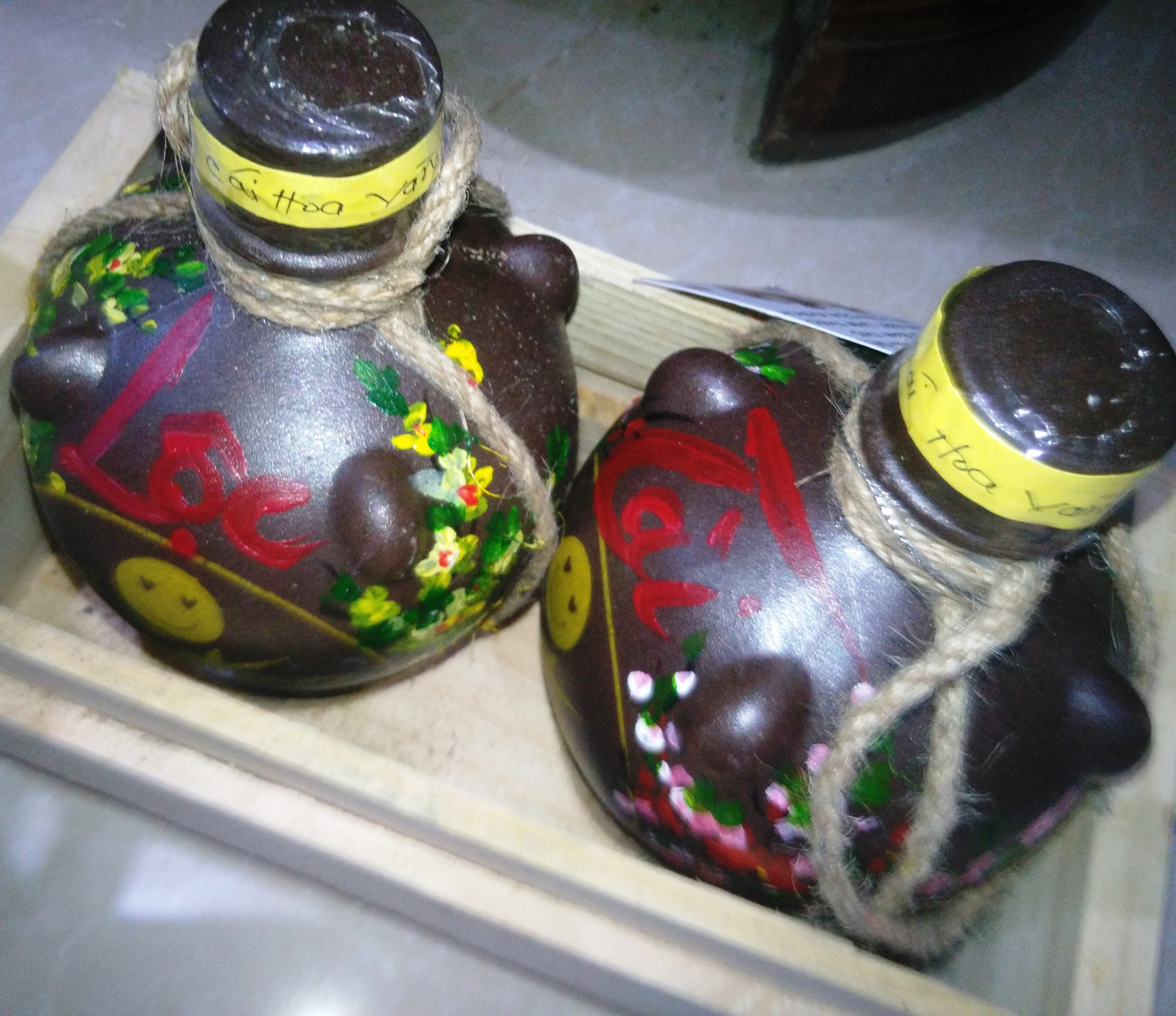
Rượu nếp cái hoa vàng

Cơm rượu (Vietnamese pronunciation: [kəːm ʐɨə̌ˀw]) is a traditional Vietnamese dessert from Southern Vietnam, made from glutinous rice. It is also offered on the fifth of May of the lunar calendar, the Vietnamese Mid-year festival.

To prepare cơm rượu, glutinous rice is cooked, mixed with yeast, and rolled into small balls. The balls are served in a slightly alcoholic milky, white liquid which is essentially a form of rice wine, and which also contains small amounts of sugar and salt. The wine rice is known as rượu nếp cái.

In Northern Vietnam, a similar dessert (which is thicker, with no liquid, and not made into balls) is called xôi rượu.

Northern-style cơm rượu uses nếp cái hoa vàng or nếp than.

Cơm rượu in the central region is made with nếp ngỗng, and is cut into thick squares, and fermented in layers of banana leaves. This variation is also the strongest.

== See also ==
- Chè
- List of desserts
- Rượu nếp
