= 酒 =

酒 is an East Asian word which means wine or alcoholic beverage.

酒 may refer to:

- Jiu or Chinese alcoholic beverages, any alcoholic beverage of China, huangjiu, baijiu, mijiu and so on.
- Sul (술) or any traditional alcoholic beverage of Korea, written with the suffix -ju (주; 酒).
- Sake (shu), a Japanese alcoholic beverage made from rice.
- Omiki (お神酒), a Japanese ritual offering of sake
  - Miki (Okinawa), a non-alcoholic related beverage

== See also ==
- Shaojiu (disambiguation)
