= Mirin =

Japanese rice wine used for cooking

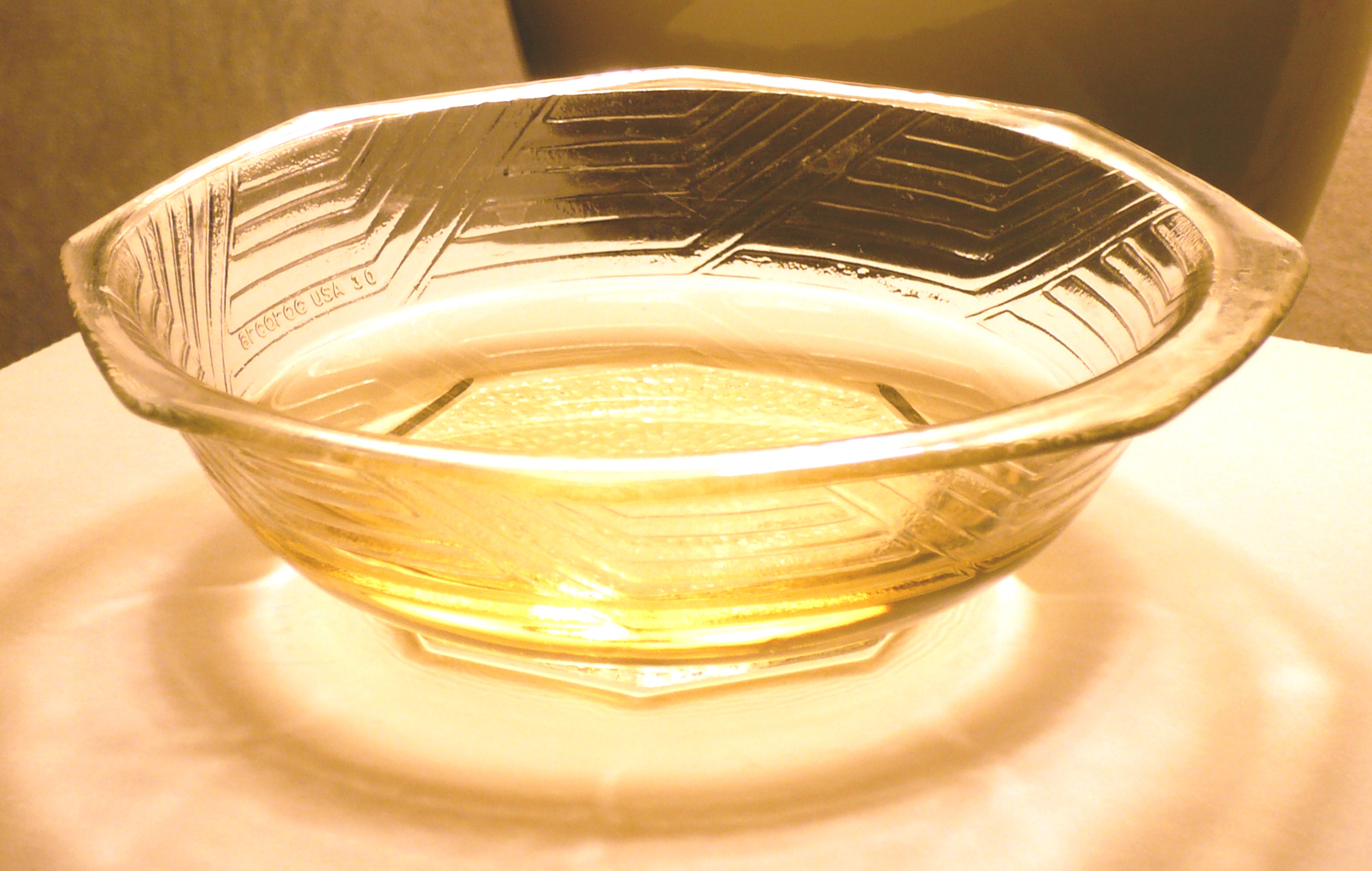
- Mirin, sweet rice wine
- Type: Cooking wine
- Place of origin: Japan
- Main ingredients: Rice

Mirin (味醂 or みりん; Japanese: [miɾiɴ]) is a type of rice wine and a common ingredient in Japanese cooking. It is similar to sake but with a lower alcohol content and higher sugar content. The sugar content is a complex carbohydrate that forms naturally during the fermentation process; no sugars are added. The alcohol content is further lowered when the liquid is heated.

== Preparation ==
Traditional mirin is produced through the saccharification of steamed glutinous rice (mochi-gome) mixed with rice kōji (rice cultured with the fungus Aspergillus oryzae) and a distilled spirit, typically shōchū or a neutral brewed alcohol. The process begins with the preparation of moromi (the mash), where the starch and proteins in the rice are broken down by enzymes in the kōji into sugars, such as glucose and oligosaccharides, and savory amino acids. Unlike sake production, alcohol is present from early in production to inhibit excessive yeast fermentation (which preserves more natural sugars) and to act as an antiseptic against spoilage.

The mixture is aged in tanks for 40 to 60 days on average, during which it develops its characteristic color, sweetness, and umami profile. Modern techniques may also incorporate non-glutinous rice to diversify flavor options. Once the aging process is complete, the liquid concentrate is pressed from the mash and heated to halt enzymatic activity. Finally, the liquid is filtered to remove any remaining rice residues, resulting in a clear, shelf-stable seasoning.

== Types ==
Three types of products are marketed as mirin. The first is hon mirin (literally: true mirin), which contains about 14% alcohol and is produced by a 40-to-60-day mashing (saccharification) process. The second is shio mirin (literally: salt mirin), which contains a minimum of 1.5% salt to prevent consumption and thus be exempt from alcohol tax.

The third are mirin-like seasonings called shin mirin (literally: new mirin), or mirin-fu chomiryo (literally: mirin-like seasoning), which are substitutes not actually mirin. They are blends of sweetener syrups, flavorings such as kōji extracts, and flavour enhancers. They contain less than 1% alcohol.

The term or trade name aji-mirin (literally: taste mirin) can mean various things, such as salt mirin, synthetic mirin, or mirin-like seasonings.

== Uses ==
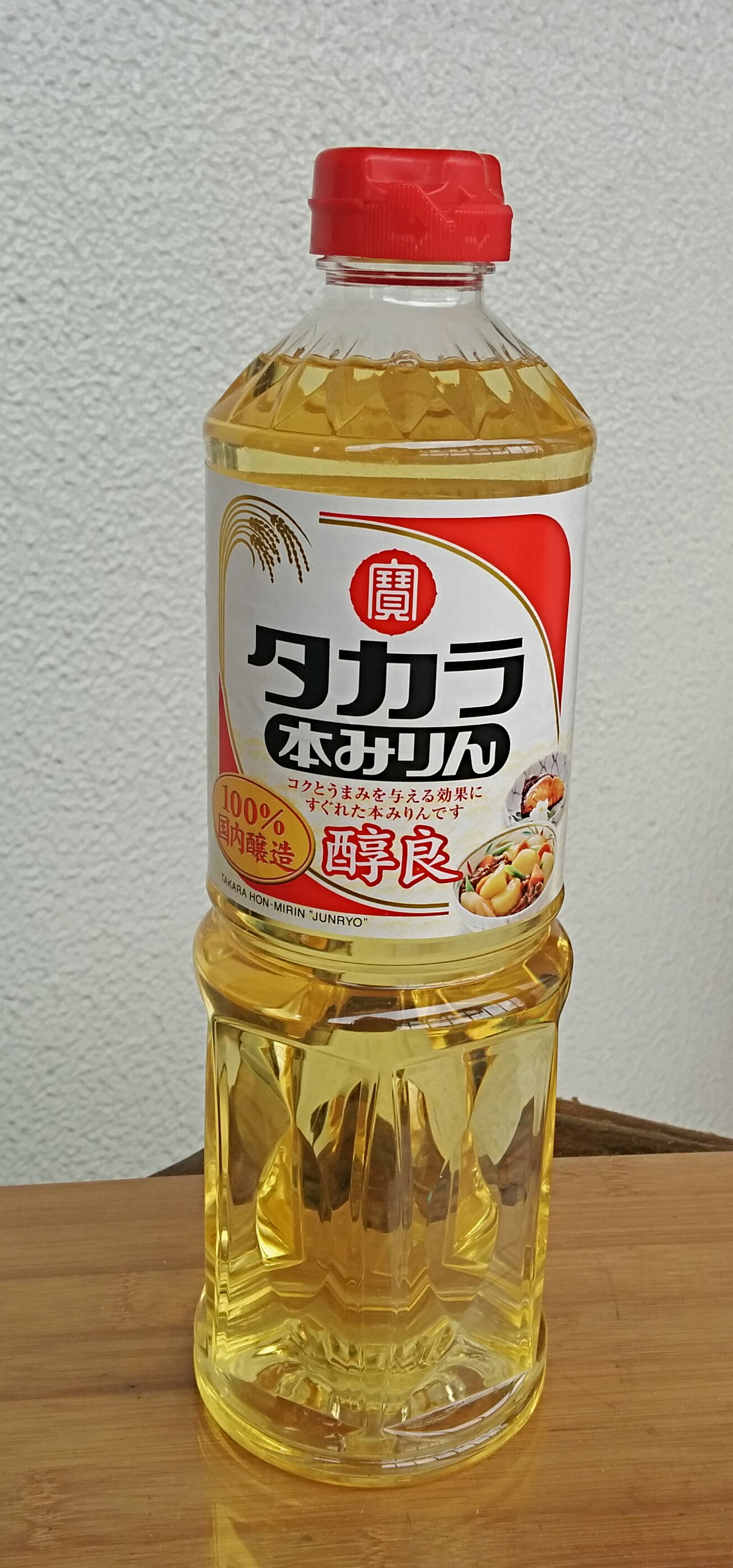
A bottle of commercially produced mirin

The modern form of mirin originated around the start of the 17th century. It was originally a sweet variety of sake, distinguished from the typical sake made with non-glutinous rice by the inclusion of glutinous rice. Over the following century and a half, mirin was consumed as amazake, and was integrated into cooking, particularly via Edo (modern Tokyo). O-toso, traditionally consumed for the Japanese New Year, can be made by soaking a spice mixture in mirin.

In the Kansai style of cooking, mirin is briefly boiled before use, allowing some alcohol to evaporate. In the Kantō regional style, the mirin is used untreated. Kansai-style boiled mirin is called nikiri mirin (煮切り味醂) (literally: thoroughly boiled mirin).

Mirin adds a bright touch to grilled or broiled fish or erases the fishy smell. A small amount is often used instead of sugar and soy sauce. It is sometimes used to accompany sushi.

Mirin is also an ingredient in other sauces:

- Kabayaki (grilled eel) sauce: mirin, soy sauce, sake, sugar, fish bone (optional)
- Nikiri mirin sauce: soy sauce, dashi, mirin, sake, in a ratio of 10:2:1:1
- Sushi su (sushi rice vinaigrette): rice wine vinegar, sugar, nikiri mirin sauce
- Teriyaki sauce

== See also ==
- Huangjiu – Chinese rice wine that can be used in cooking
- Japanese flavorings
- Mijiu – Chinese rice wine that can be used in cooking
