= Chinese rice wine =

Chinese rice wine may refer to:

- Mijiu, made from glutinous rice
- Huangjiu, made from rice or other grains through a different process
