= Liuquanju =

Restaurant in Beijing, China

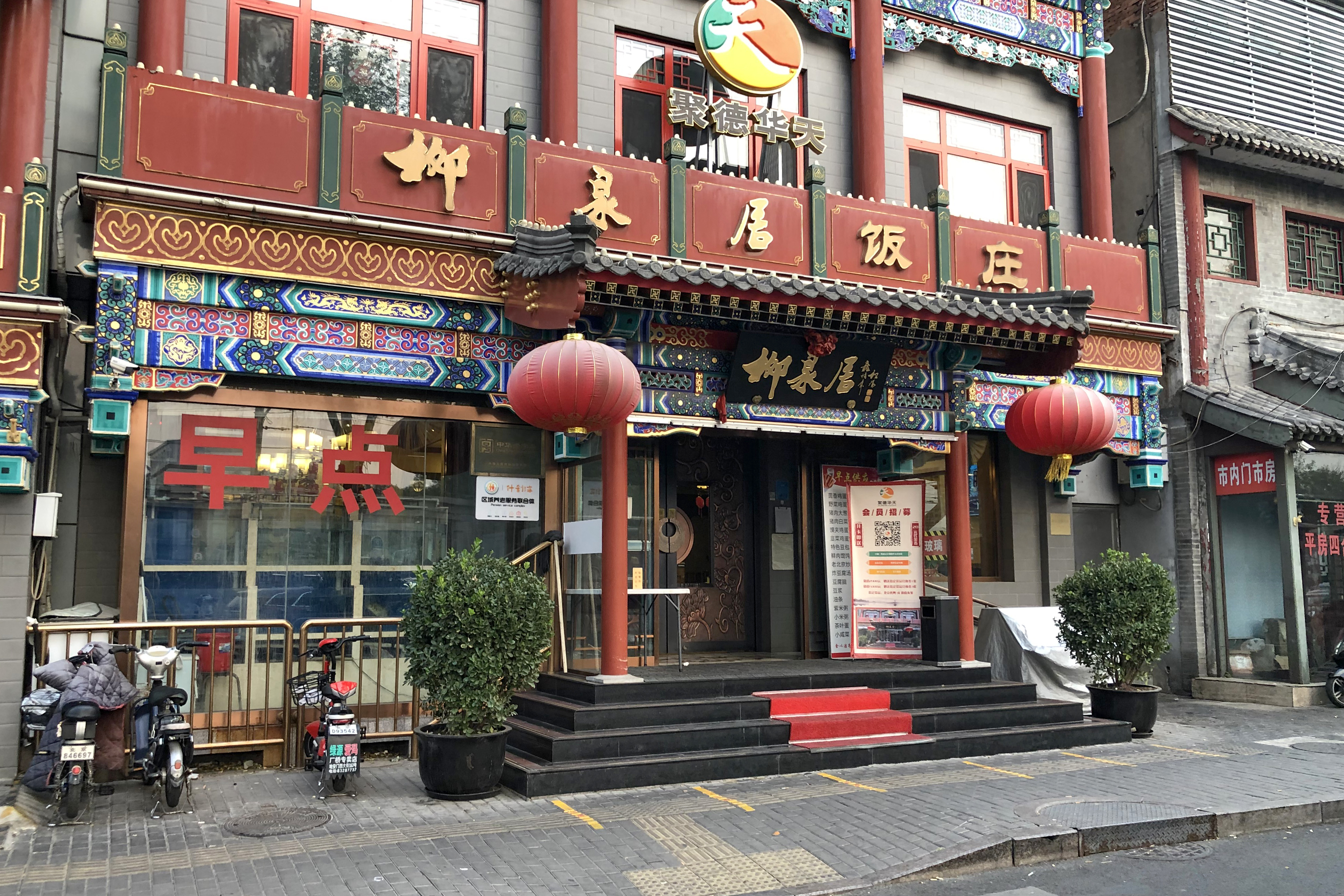
- Native name: 柳泉居
- Industry: Restaurants
- Headquarters: Beijing, China

Liuquanju
- Simplified Chinese: 柳泉居
- Traditional Chinese: 柳泉居
- Literal meaning: Willow Spring House
Transcriptions
Standard Mandarin
- Hanyu Pinyin: Liǔquánjù

Liuquanju, founded in 1567, is one of the oldest restaurants in Beijing, China. The name translated from Chinese means Willow Spring House and historic documents noted there was a big willow tree in the courtyard.

It was a well-known Beijing Yellow Wine tavern from its founding during the Ming dynasty. The first owners were merchants from the Shandong Province. In 1949 the restaurant moved to 217 Nandajie Street, Xinjiekou (新街口南大街217号), Beijing.

== See also ==
- List of oldest companies
