= Sato (drink) =

Rice wine

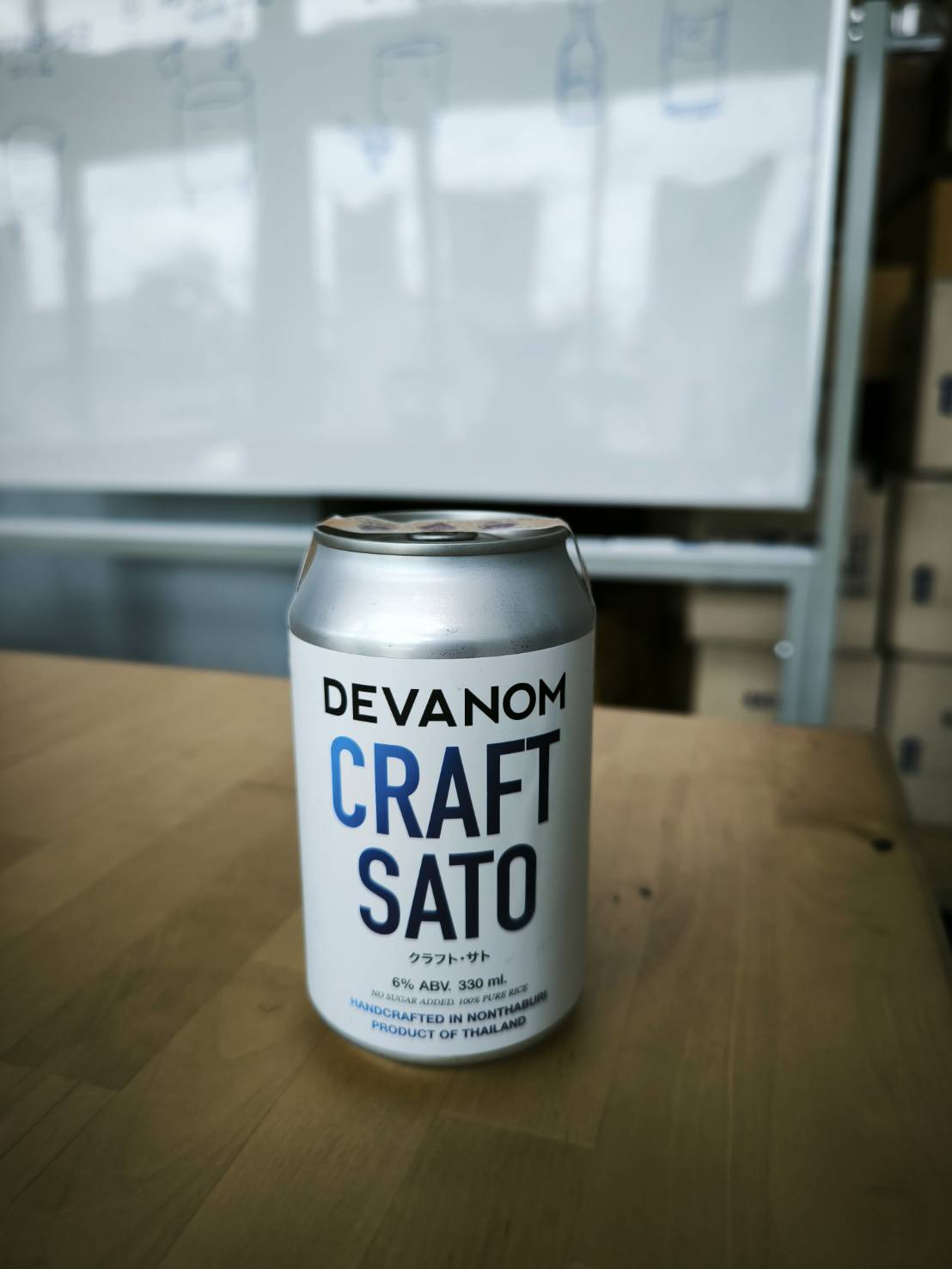
Modern sato produced by Devanom, a brewery in Nonthaburi.

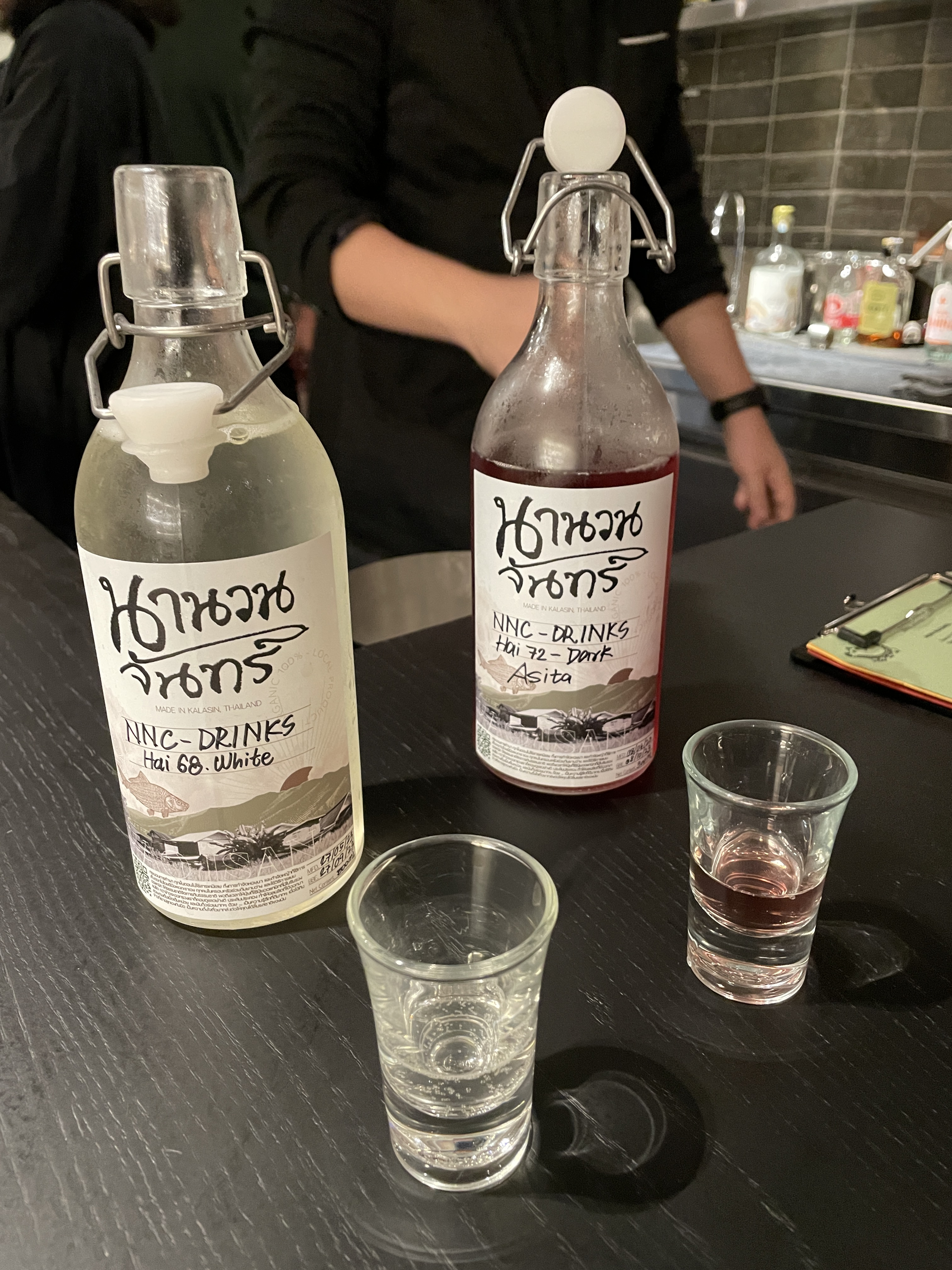
Organic Nanuanchun sato from Kalasin province, Thailand

Sato (Thai: สาโท, RTGS: satho, pronounced [sǎː.tʰōː]) is a traditional northeastern Thailand (Isan) alcoholic fermented drink that has been made for centuries from starchy glutinous or sticky rice by growers in that region. Just as other regional varieties made not from grapes but cereal are commonly called wine rather than beer, sato is commonly called Thai rice wine. When brewed in little brown jugs called hai (ไห), it is called lao hai (เหล้าไห) or lao u (เหล้าอุ).

== History ==
Due to the internal migration of people from Isan throughout Thailand, sato (like many forms of northeastern Thai cuisine) has become increasingly familiar to the general population, as well as expatriates and tourists visiting Bangkok. This plus the availability of commercially produced sato have increased its popularity. Under the Thai government's One Tambon One Product program (a government sponsored economic development program abbreviated ๑T๑P and pronounced OTOP), several districts chose revenue-stamped sato as their OTOP product. Brewers today produce sato under such names as "Siam Sato", "Ruan Rak", "Gru Pli", among others.

== Lao hai ==
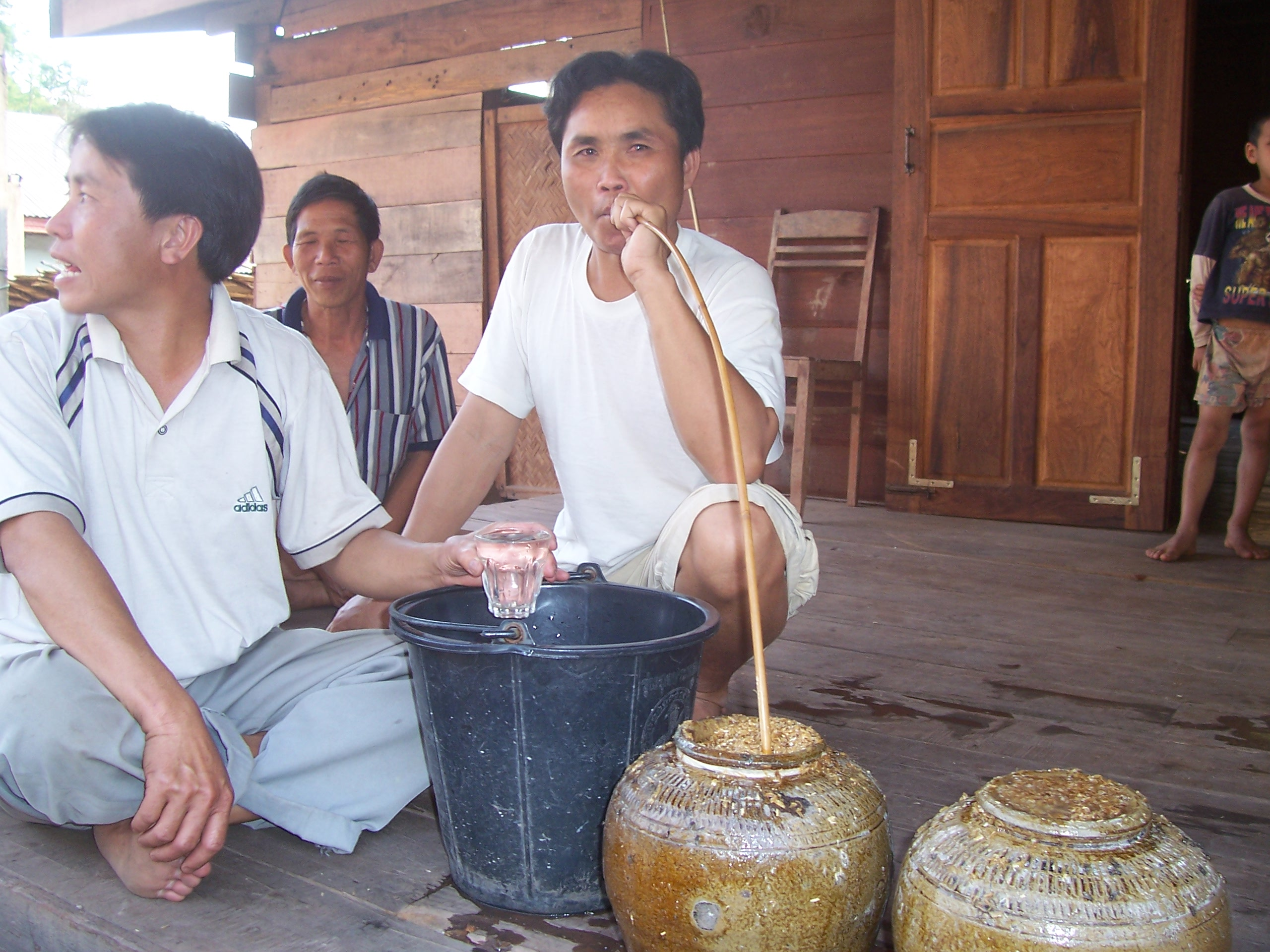
Lao-Khamu men drinking lao-hai from an earthenware jar using a bamboo straw. Water is added to the jar to maintain the liquid level as the alcohol is sipped.

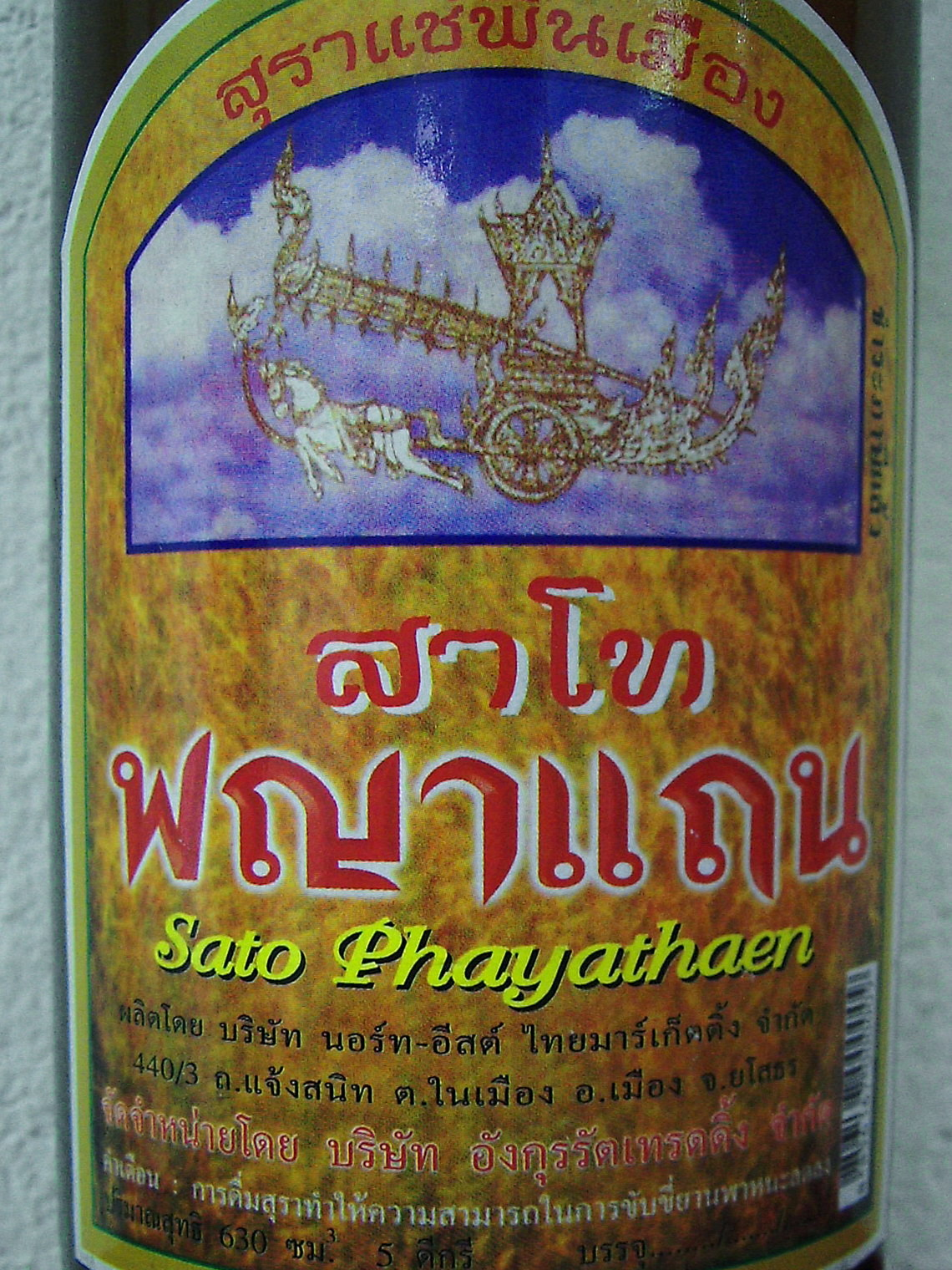
A bottle of Sato Phayathaen, labeled to promote the Rocket Festival in the northeastern Thai province of Yasothon

Lao hai (เหล้าไห) is sato brewed in earthenware jars or jugs (hai). It is also called lao u (เหล้าอู alcohol [of] cradle) — lao is alcohol as in lao-Lao (Lao: ເຫລົ້າລາວ alcohol [of] Laos), u is "cradle" in the sense of holding something under construction.

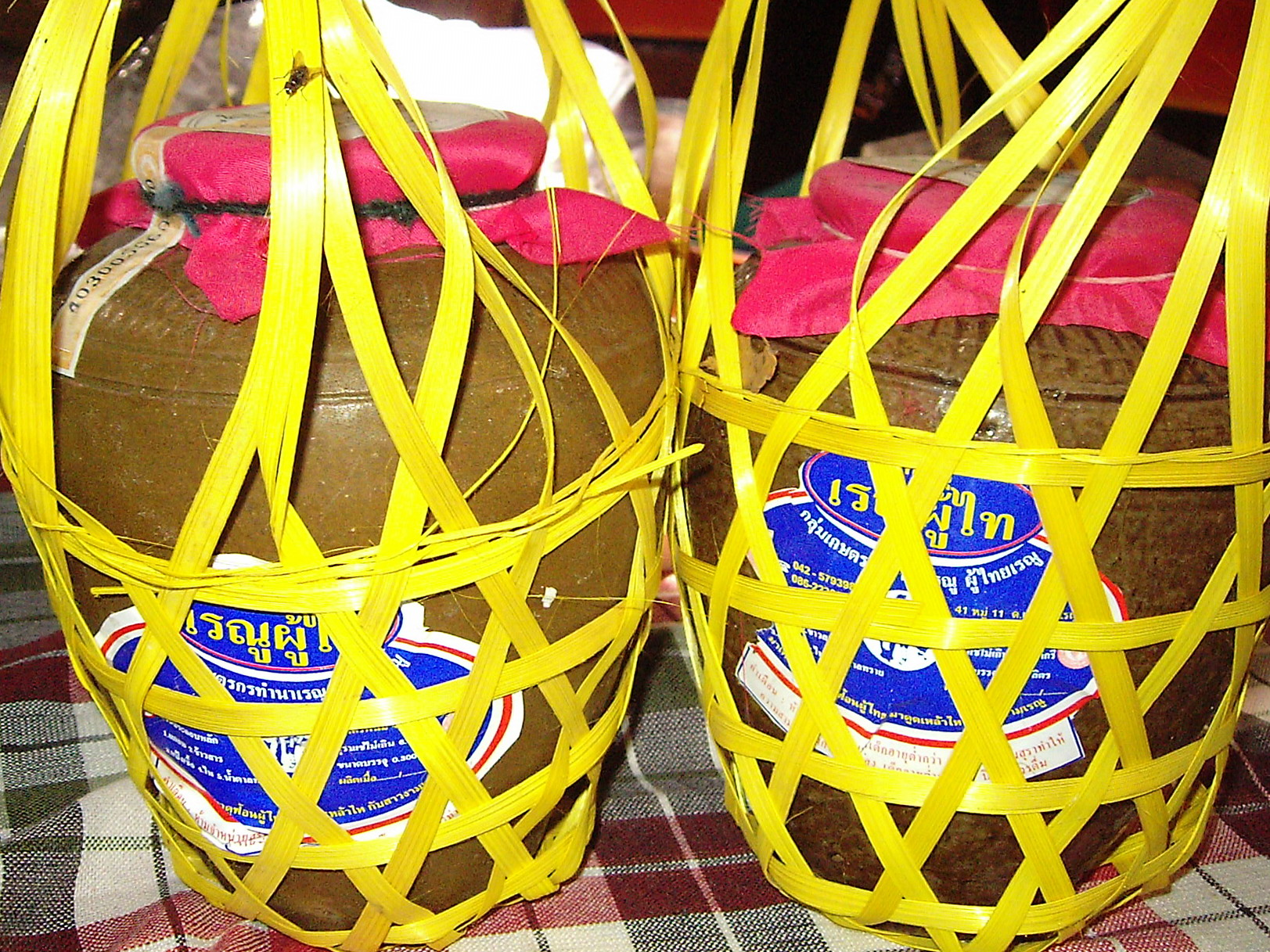
Little Brown Jug of Phu Thai Renu

Some, such as the Phu Thai of Renu, sell home brew sato kits in little brown jugs (ไห hai) of various sizes. These also bear revenue stamps and, like the bottled variety, warnings that it is not to be served to those under 18. Typical ingredients include rice chaff, milled rice, and refined sugar, and these make a rice wine of not more than 6.4 percent alcohol.

== Brewing ==
Sato is brewed with glutinous rice (ข้าวเหนียว) (also called sticky rice); a starter culture, a mixture including primarily sugar; yeast; and water. Traditionally, a starter culture known as luk paeng (ลูกแป้ง, a small ball of starch, yeast, and mold) is used to assist in fermentation. The steamed sticky rice is mixed with luk paeng and kept in a fermentation tank for three days, as the starch in the rice changes to sugar. Water is then added to the fermentation tank and the mixture is allowed to ferment for a further week. Following that, the fresh rice wine is pressed from the dregs, and filtered.

Lao hai is prepared by breaking the seal in the mouth of the jar and adding clean water, then immediately drunk.

Owing to the simplicity of the process, the resultant beverage is often of variable quality and has a short shelf life. Some molds and yeasts produce mycotoxins. Ergot, the common name of a fungus in the genus Claviceps that is parasitic on certain grains and grasses, also occurs in tropical regions, and may cause ergotism.

== Serving ==
Sato is typically served at room temperature. In Isan, sato is usually served in a large bowl, into which individuals dip their glasses or cups. Lao hai is sold with a pair of bamboo drinking straws, and labels recommend serving to couples.

== See also ==
- Rượu cần, in Vietnam
- Sra peang, in Cambodia
- Lao-Lao
