= Lao-Lao =

Laotian rice whisky produced in Laos

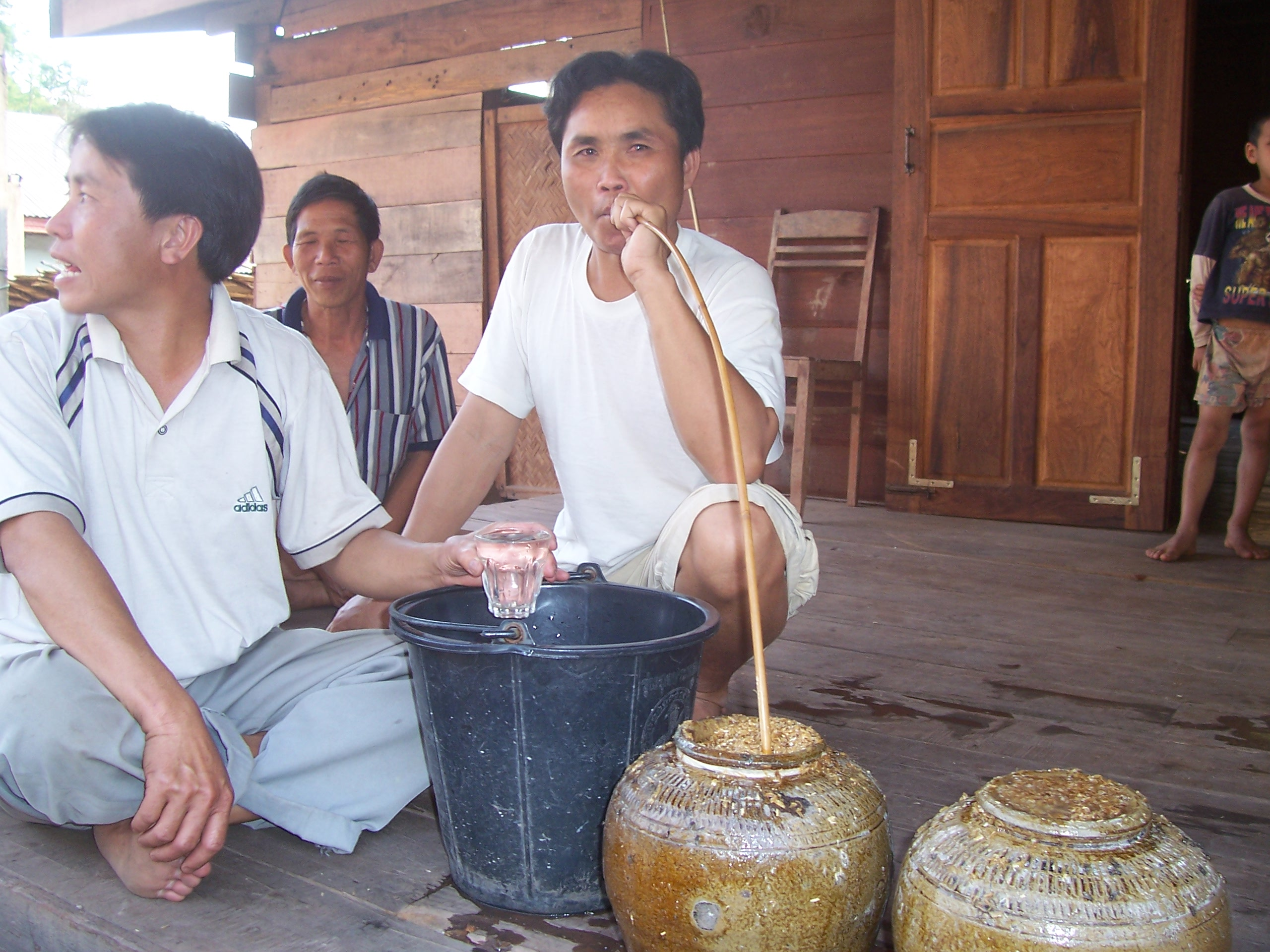
Lao-Khamu men drinking lao-hai from an earthenware jar. Water is added to the jar to maintain the liquid level as the alcohol is sipped.

Lao-Lao (Lao: ເຫລົ້າລາວ) is a Laotian rice whisky produced in Laos. Along with Beerlao, lao-Lao is a staple drink in Laos.

== Etymology ==
The name lao-Lao is not the same word repeated twice, but two different words pronounced with different tones: the first, ເຫລົ້າ, means "alcohol" and is pronounced with a low-falling tone in the standard dialect, while the second, ລາວ, means Laotian ("Lao") and is pronounced with a high(-rising) tone.

== Taste ==
Quality, taste and alcohol concentration vary by source of the drink. However, all variations are strong. Lao satoe, the white liquid by-product from lao-Lao production, is also drunk and has a very yeasty and sweet taste.

== Production and consumption ==
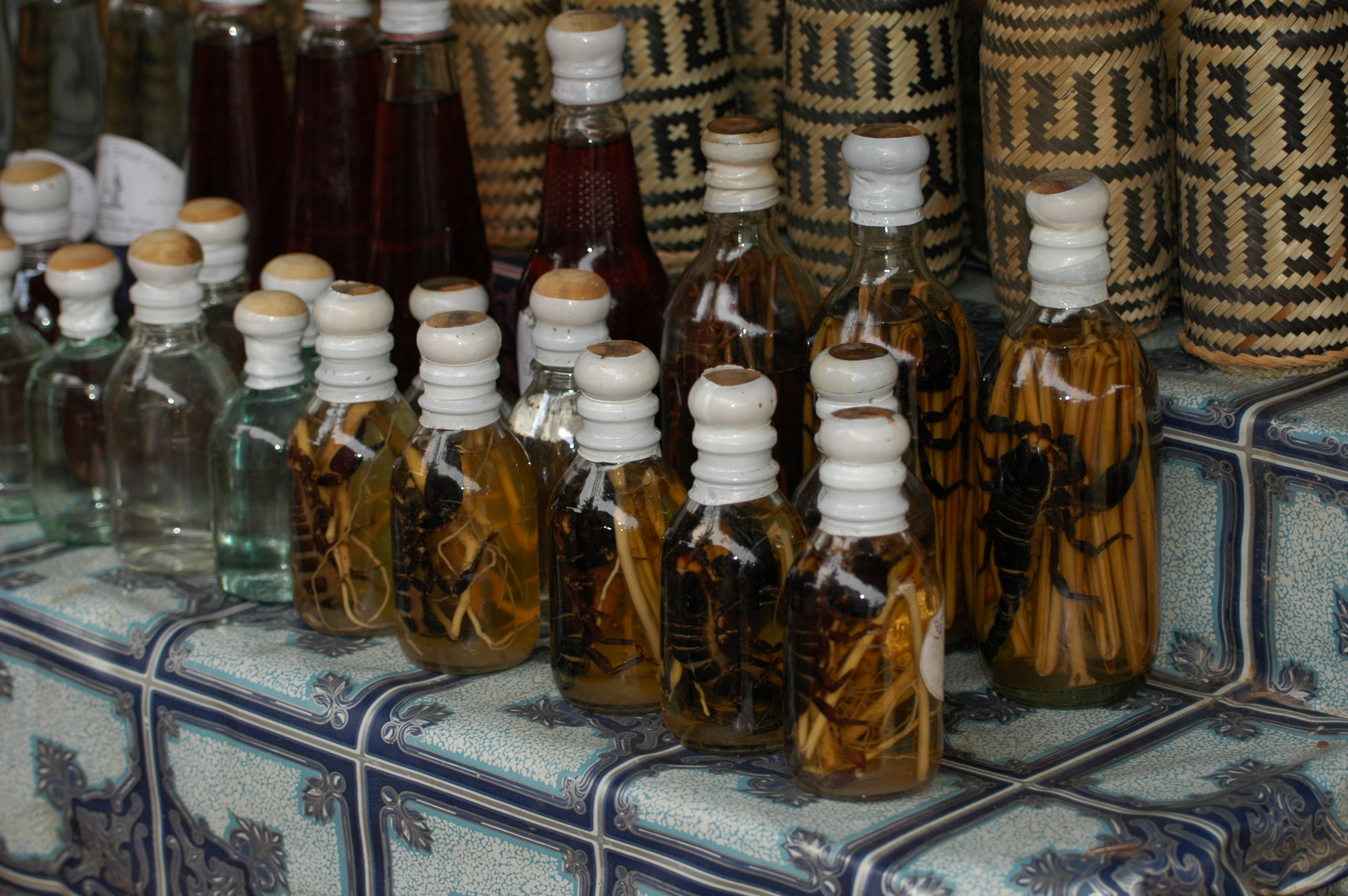
lao-Lao with scorpions

Although lao-Lao is traditionally drunk neat, a cocktail that is rising in popularity is the "Pygmy Slow Lorange", named after the pygmy slow loris, a species endemic to Laos. Various flavoured lao-Laos are made by macerating such additives as honey or scorpions. It is women who often distill lao-Lao and sell it as a source of income locally, often being their second major income. Lao-Lao sold on retail is usually clear, but amber colored varieties exist too.

It is traditional to serve two glasses of lao-Lao on ceremonies, feasts and other comparable situations. Customarily, it is expected to be drunk in a single gulp.

A less powerful version of lao-Lao, called lao-hai, is especially popular with the Khamu ethnic group in Laos, and is drunk from large communal earthenware pots (hai) through long bamboo straws.

== See also ==
- Sra peang, a similar form of wine drunk in Cambodia
- Rượu cần, a similar form of wine drunk in Vietnam
- Rice wine
- Rice baijiu
- Sato (rice wine) – Isan version
