= Shaojiu (disambiguation) =

Shaojiu, 燒酒 or 焼酎 (lit. 'burned (distilled) liquor') is the name for several types of distilled beverages in East Asia. It may refer to:

- Shaojiu (烧酒/燒酒), more commonly known as Baijiu (白酒), a 56–130 proof Chinese liquor
- Shōchū (焼酎), a 40–70 proof Japanese liquor
- Soju (소주/燒酒), a 33.6–106 proof Korean liquor

== See also ==
- 酒 (disambiguation)
- Shōchū (era)
- Shoyu, soy sauce
