= Nanuanchun =

Thai sato brand

- Native name: นานวนจันทร์
- Company type: Private
- Founded: 2021
- Founder: Keng-Songpon Pharupon
- Headquarters: Somdet, Kalasin, Thailand
- Website: nanuanchun.com

Nanuanchun (Thai: นานวนจันทร์) is a Thai sato brand manufactured in Somdet district, Kalasin province, Thailand. Founded by architect Keng-Songpon Pharupon (Thai: เก่ง ทรงพล ผาฤพล) in 2021, the sato is produced from sticky rice.

== History ==
In 2023, the sato was first sold at the Bangkok Art Book Fair, and later in the year began to be served at Samrub Samrub Thai in Bangkok, and in 2025 at Noi Samrub Bar.

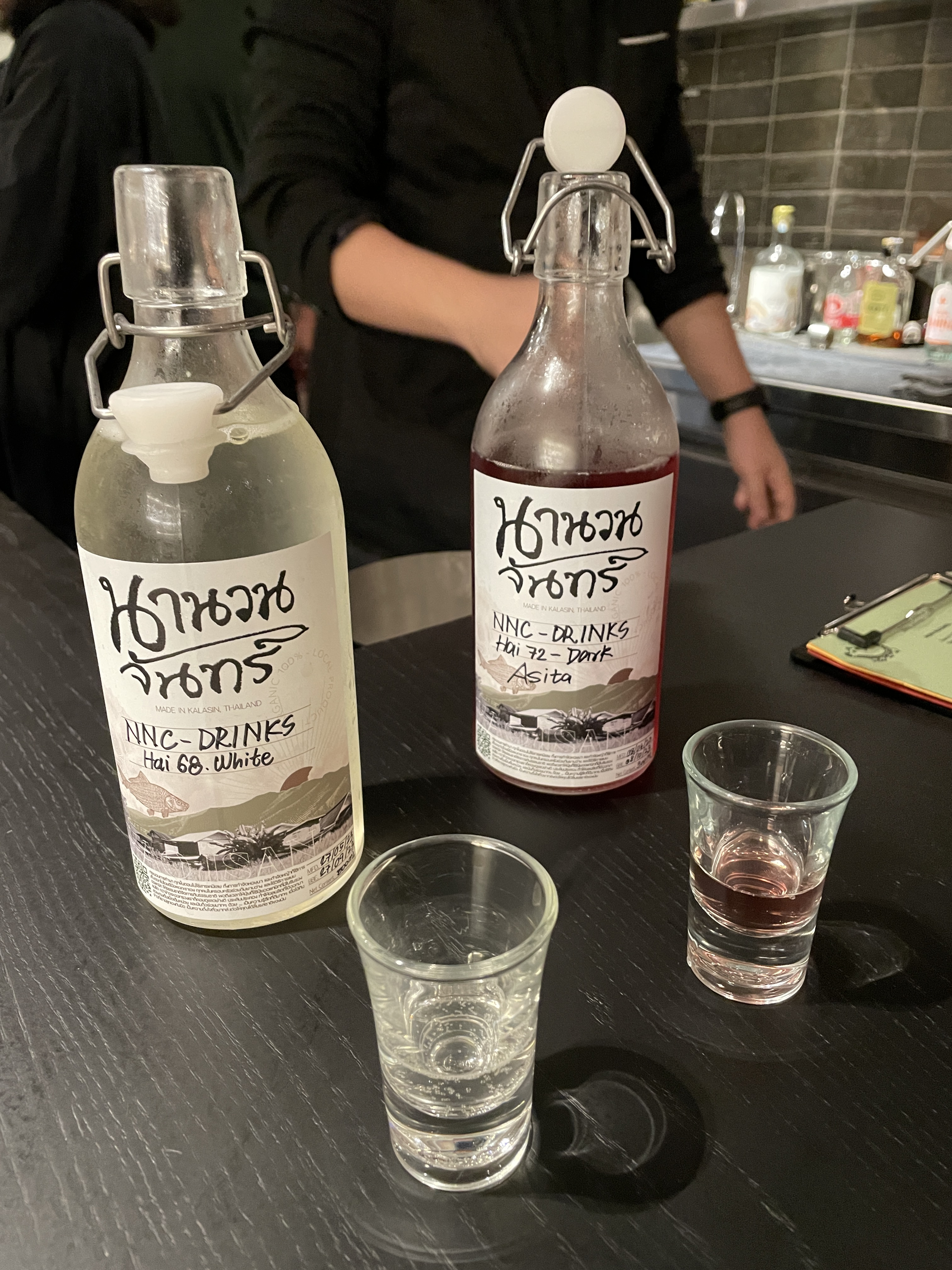
Nanuanchun sato

In 2025, Nanuanchun won a silver medal in the "Best Traditional Sato" category at Sake week Thailand.
