= Bunong house =

Houses built by the Bunong people in Mondulkiri

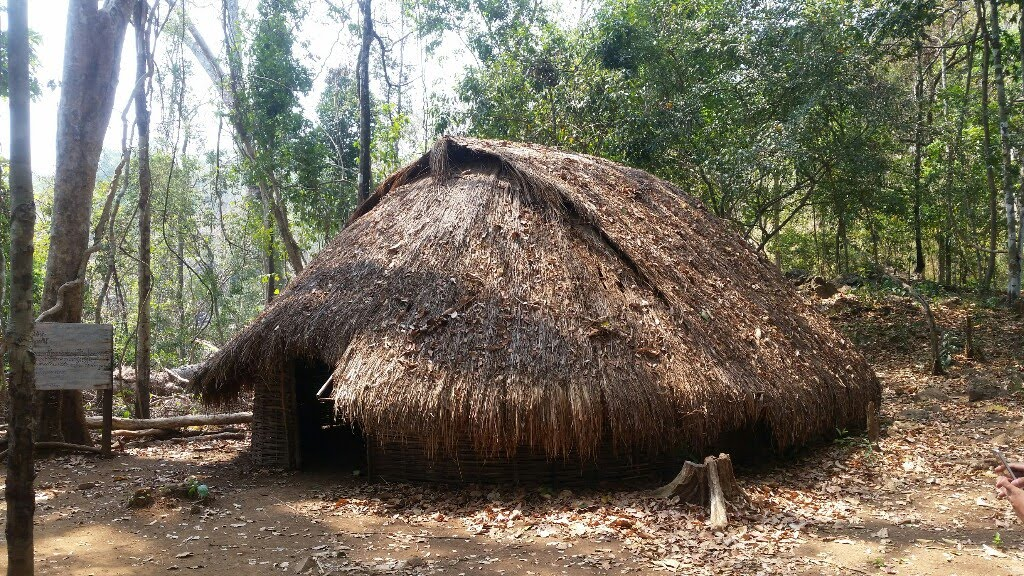
Traditional Bunong house with thatched grass roof and flattened bamboo walls.

Bunong house (ផ្ទះឞូន៝ងពីបុរាណ) are circular straw houses built by the Bunong people in Cambodia and Vietnam.

== Description ==
=== Structure: thatched grass roof and flattened bamboo walls ===
The traditional Bunong house is built with almost no legs and has a thatched grass roof and flattened bamboo walls.

The architecture is close to the conical Mbaru Niang house of rumah adat traditional houses built in any of the vernacular architecture styles of Indonesia, collectively belonging to the Austronesian architecture.

If the habitat of the Bunong can be interpreted as a sign of their mindset, the single common room where the family gathers around the central fire of the Bunong house "speaks to the global and intimate as mutually constituted entities".

=== Inner design: dark rooms and precious artefacts ===
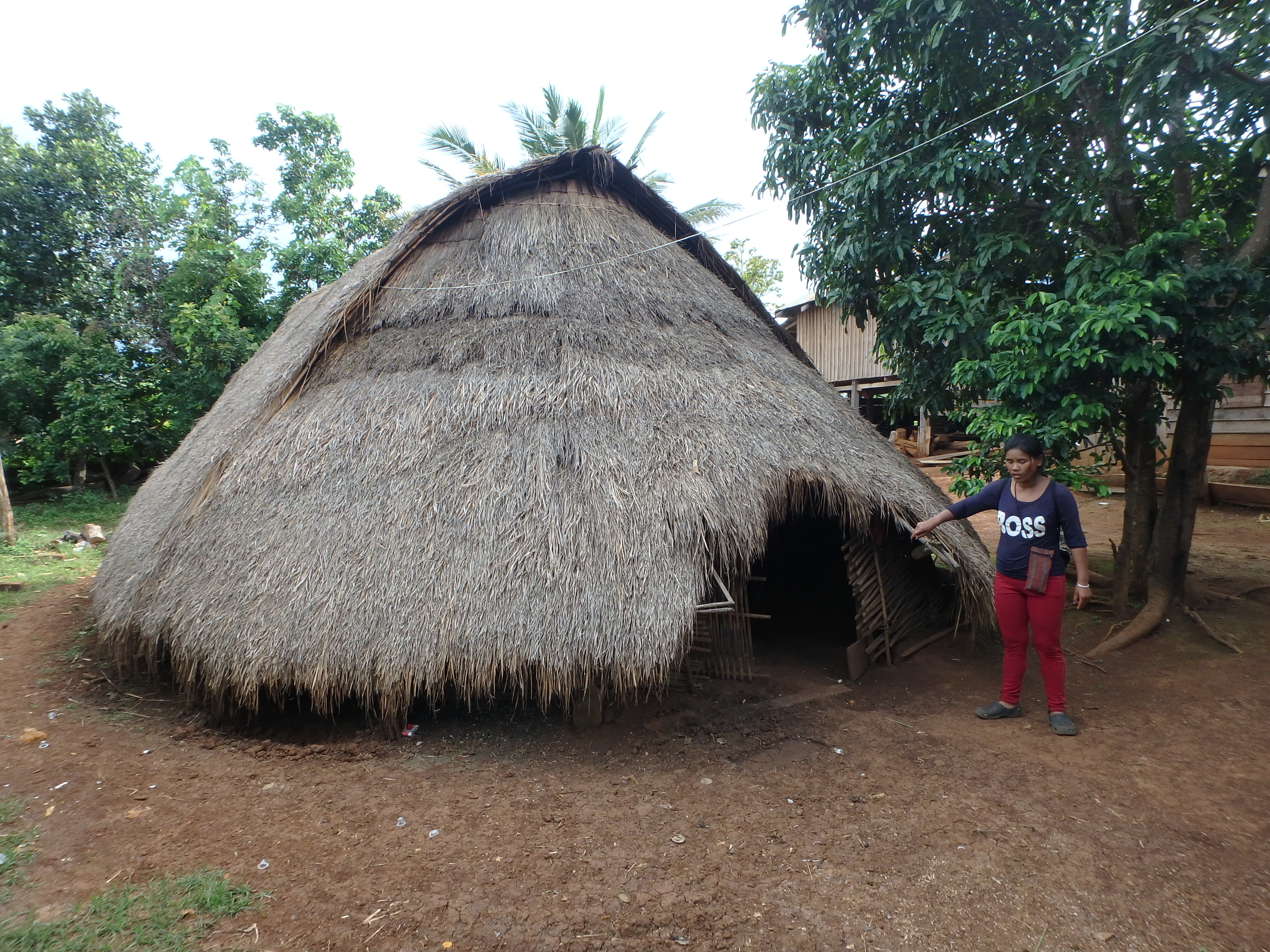
Traditional Bunong house in a village surrounded by Khmer wooden houses on pillars.

The traditional Bunong house has no windows and the main door is the only source of light. This results in a rather dark atmosphere inside the house where fire and oil lamps are the main source of artificial light.

Bunong houses are the treasure chest of the most valuable artefacts of the local people, namely large jars, which are sometimes believed more than a thousand years old. The jars are used for drinking sra peang.

In the houses, the Bunong also keep there traditional gongs. There are various gongs used at different occasions.

== Rites ==
The traditional Bunong house gives a lot of room to the local spirits different from the Cambodian neak ta. The household rice is thus kept in the house in a central cellar protected by a rice spirit as the head of the house (njoh baa). A main altar (kuat njoh), and the fireplace (lu-nak) are also consecrated to the local spirits (brah jaang). When these spirits are disturbed, rituals such as sacrifices of chicken and rites of purification are made to repair the relationship with the local good. However, as the Bunong population embraces Christianity, these rites are being replaced by images of the Divine Mercy and the Our Lady of Sorrows and Christians ask their priests to celebrate house blessings. A traditional Bunong house was thus built at the Catholic church of Bou Sra.

== Conservation ==
Bunong houses can still be seen in Mondulkiri in villages such as Dak Dam. Many of the traditional houses were burned and bombed during the Cambodian Civil War or left in disrepair after continuous movement of the populations caught in the Vietnam War. While since the 2010s the Khmer-style house on pillars and the more modern phteah lveng are growing more popular, the traditional Bunong house can still be seen in the villages however. More recently, Traditional housing has been threatened by deforestation and real estate development. The disappearance of the Bunong house has become a symbol of the "sense of urgency to protect the culture of ethnic minorities". However, the Bunong community and other non-governmental organizations such as Refugees International have been careful to protect and rebuild this heritage, in order to create village centres for producing Bunong handicrafts.

Visiting and sleeping in a Bunong house has become an integral part of community-owned ecotourism in Mondulkiri.

== Related articles ==
- Bunong people
- Sra peang
