= Devanom =

- Native name: เทพนม
- Company type: Private
- Founded: 2014

Devanom (Thai: เทพนม) is a Thai brewing company founded in 2014 by brothers Nattachai "Ob" Ungsriwong and Teerapat "Art" Ungsriwong. Based in Nonthaburi, Devanom produces craft beer, mead, and sato and operates Thailand's first hops farm.

== History ==
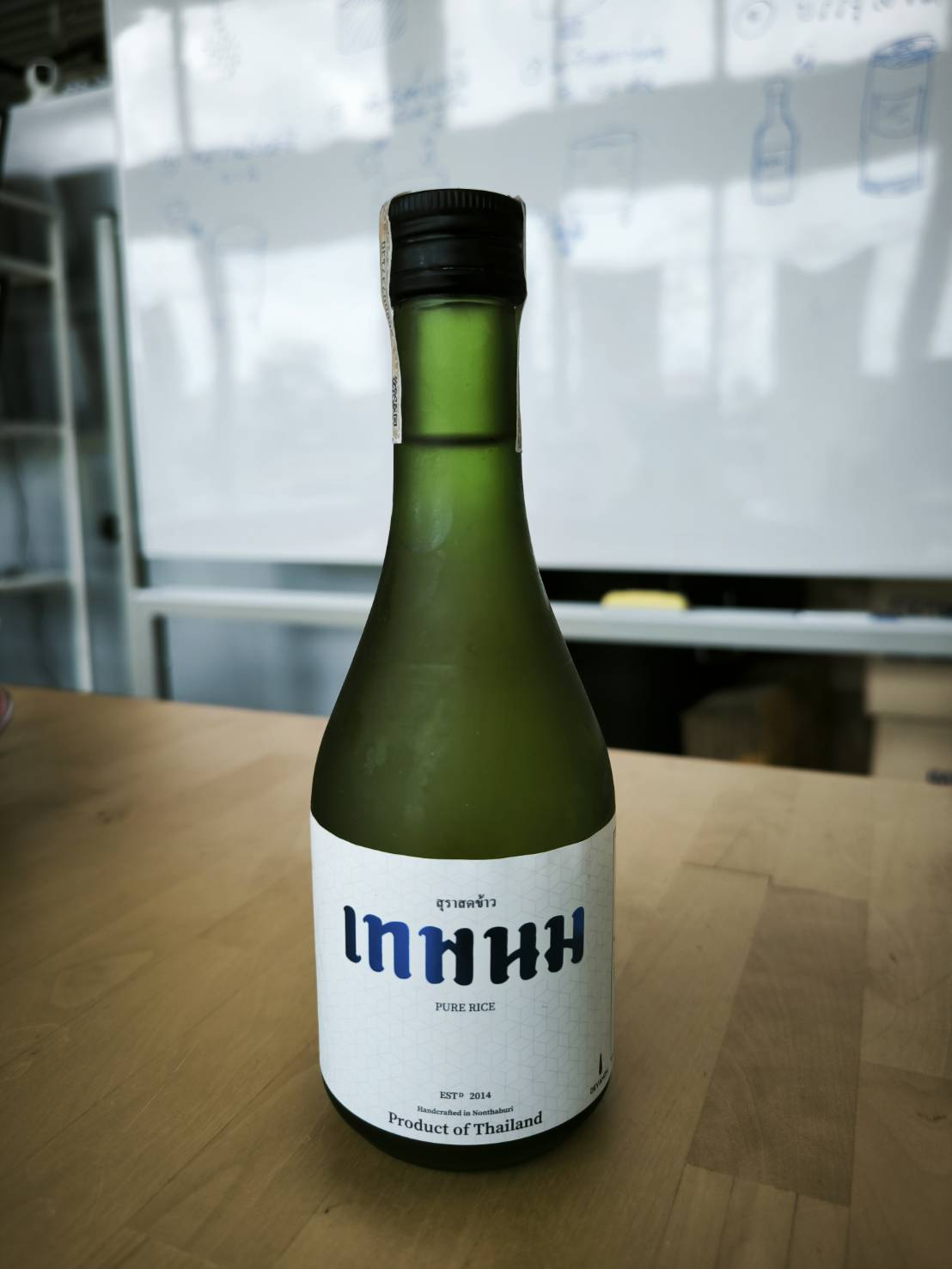
Sato produced by Devanom

In 2016, Devanom's beer won the Wheat Beer and IPA Beer Award in from Beer Camp: Fight Club.

In 2024, both Ob and Art began to advocate for the liberalization of Thailand's liquor laws.
