= Mixiang Baijiu =

Variety of Chinese baijiu

Mixiang baijiu (米香白酒, mǐ-xiāng báijiǔ; literally “rice-aroma baijiu”) is a style of Chinese distilled spirit made entirely from polished rice rather than the more common sorghum. Contemporary trade and academic literature group it with sauce-, strong- and light-aroma spirits as one of the “four major aromas” that structure modern baijiu classification. Because its ester load is lower than in sorghum spirits, commentators describe mixiang baijiu as an approachable gateway for drinkers familiar with vodka, soju or mild sake.

== Sensory profile ==
Rice baijiu is famous for having a characteristic rice fragrance. One famous brand of rice baijiu is called Sanhuajiu (三花酒; literally "three flower wine"), which is produced in Guilin, Guangxi province.

Instrumental analyses identify ethyl lactate, acetic acid and isoamyl alcohol as signature volatiles, with principal-component mapping citing ethyl lactate as the key marker distinguishing mixiang baijiu from awamori and kome-shōchū. Trade writers characterise the flavour as honey-like, floral and delicately sweet, calling it “one of the most elegant baijius”.

== Name ==
The name "rice fragrance baijiu" may mislead the drinker, who may regard it as simply ordinary baijiu flavoured by rice. In fact, this kind of distilled beverage differs from sorghum-based baijiu in that its main ingredient is rice.

"Mibaijiu" is also the name of a type of Chinese rice wine produced in the Jiangsu province.

== Production methods ==
Producers steam long-grain or glutinous rice and inoculate it with xiaoqu, a rice-bran starter rich in Rhizopus moulds and wild yeasts, enabling simultaneous saccharification and fermentation in a half-solid state. The mash is distilled in small steam pots, producing spirit that national standards fix between 35% and 55% ABV.

== See also ==
- Awamori
- Rice wine
- Rượu đế
- Shōchū
- Soju
