= Sra peang =

Bunong alcoholic beverage

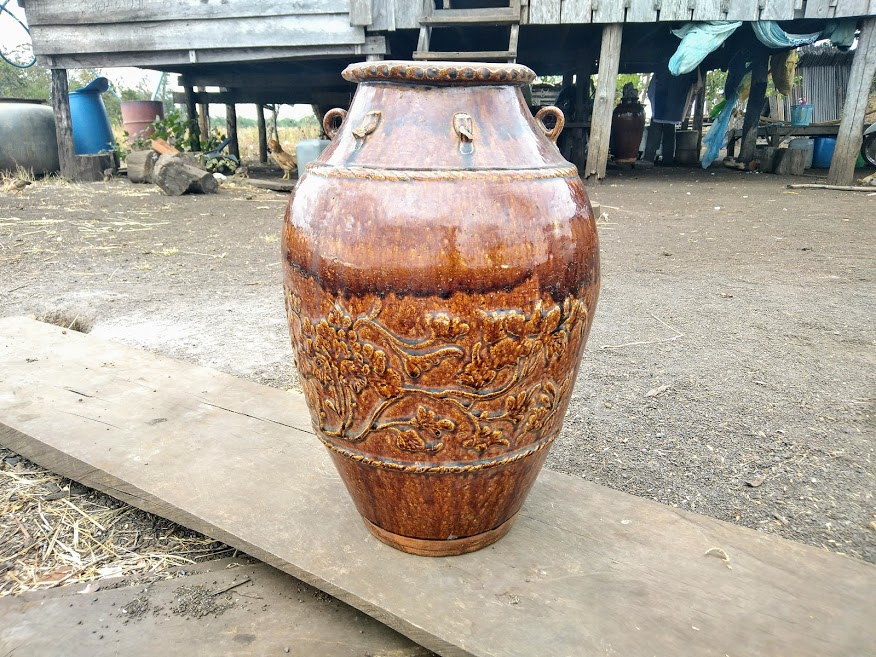
- Sra peang at a village in Mondulkiri
- Type: Rice wine
- Origin: Cambodia
- Introduced: in Angkor era
- Alcohol by volume: 15.0–25.0%
- Colour: Cloudy white
- Related products: Rượu cần, Lao-Lao

Sra peang (Khmer: ស្រាពាង, lit. 'jar wine') is a rice wine stored in earthen pots and indigenous to several ethnic groups in Cambodia, in areas such as Mondulkiri or Ratanakiri. It is made of fermented glutinous rice mixed with several kinds of local herbs (including leaves and roots). The types and amount of herbs added differ according to ethnic group and region. This mixture is then put into a large earthenware jug, covered, and allowed to ferment for at least one month. The strength of this alcoholic beverage is typically 15 to 25 percent alcohol by volume.

== Nomenclature ==
Sra peang is the Khmer name given to the wine rine mainly produced and consumed by the minority people in Northeast Cambodia and local names vary among the different indigenous groups both Mon-Khmer, such as the Brao people, Kachok people, Kravet people, Krung people, Lun people, Phnong people, Tampuan people, and Austranesian such as the Jarai, the Tai-Ladai and the Lao.

== History ==
=== Archeological traces of wine jars from Angkor era ===
According to Khmer ethnologist Ang Choulean, the jar wine was consumed by Khmer people since Angkorian times, as can be observed on some bas-relief of the Bayon temple, though the characters drinking from the beverage may actually be from Chenla. Other bas-relief in Angkor Wat represents distinctively Chinese individuals drinking from the wine jars. Khmer wine jars of the 13th century have also been observed among other ceramic artefacts of the Angkorian era, though many such artifacts are of Chinese origin. French archeologist Georges Cœdès was also able to identify rituals involving wine jars in Angkorian inscriptions.

=== An indigenous sacrifice: the rite of alliance ===
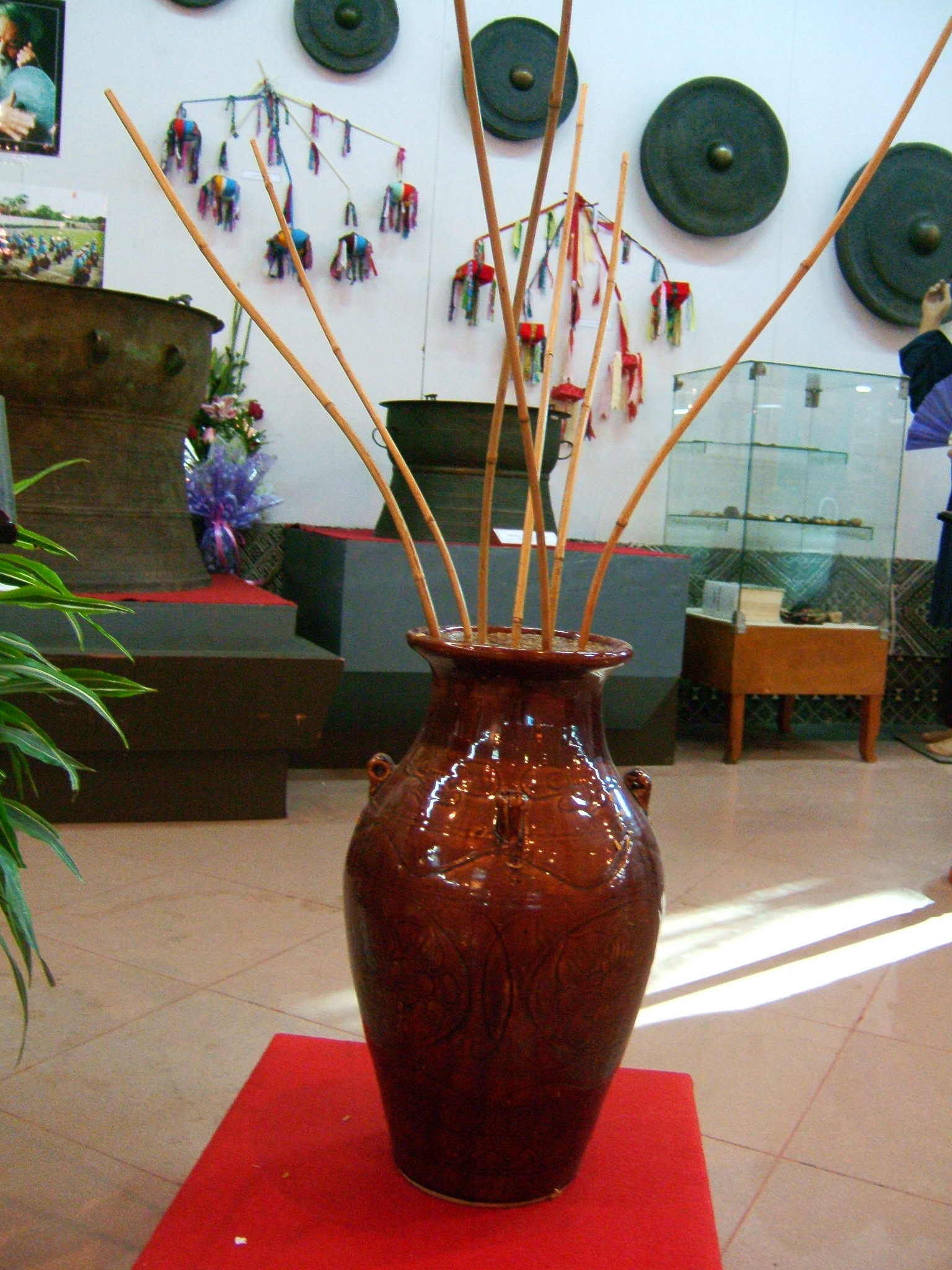
The jar of clay serves a recipient from which the rice wine is sipped from through long bamboo straws, as timber gongs are rung.

Rice wine was kept and consumed in jars until the 20th century according to French ethnologist Adhémard Leclère. However, it did not have a religious or ceremonial character.

This ritual character is observed in other ethnical groups of Cambodia such as the Phnong tribe where drinking from a wine jar is a sign of alliance closely linked with animal sacrifices. To this day, the ceremony begins with the beating of traditional gongs before the buffalo is sacrificed and its head placed on an altar. After village elders drink ceremonial rice wine from earthen jars place on the dirt floor through meter-long bamboo straws, the villagers then cook and eat the meat, he added, sharing it with all the participants.

In the Brou tribe, it has been observed that the men will sip one after the other from the wine jar for at least two rounds before women are invited to take their turn.

During the French colonization, the French officials frequently observed wine offerings and joined ceremonies involving drinking from wine jars in an effort to pacifiy remote areas of the protectorate of Cambodia where ethnic minorities resisted their presence. Wine jars therefore became a sign of alliance, or according to Khmer literary scholar Khing Hoc Dy, a "trap".

=== An element of indigenous identity and pride ===
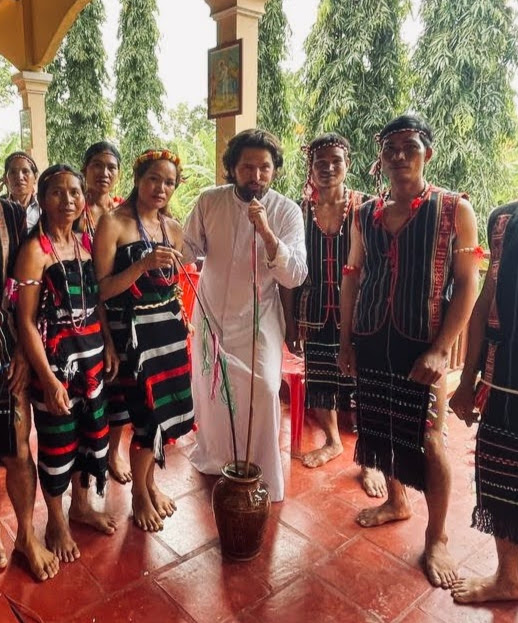
A Catholic missionary, dressed in a white cassock, taking his turn and drinking from the wine jar, on the occasion of the ordination to the diaconate of a member of the Bunong people, wearing traditional tribal clothes.

In the 1960s, when the first evangelical missionaries, Thompson and Smith, arrived to Mondulkiri, they refused to drink from what they considered to be a major animist practice. Thereafter, drinking from rice wine jars was strictly forbidden by the Christian and Missionary Alliance missionaries. In contrast, Catholic missionaries allowed the Bunong tribe which to continue using wine jars as a sign of alliance and community, to the wine jars of the marriage in Cana where Jesus turned water into wine.

In recent years, sra peang has become an element of indigenous identity kept in the Bunong houses, and it is served in ethnic restaurants in Phnom Penh as an alcoholic beverage. It is also a sign of hospitality for both environmentalists, ethnologists and tourists traveling to remote areas populated with ethnic minorities of Cambodia.

== Varieties ==
Four kinds of jar wine are found in Cambodia. The first is made from the leaves of the Lak Oan tree, which are ground and dried in the sun. The leaves are steamed and mixed with rice, a mixture that is then stored in a jar from three months to two years. Rice husks serve as the base to another cup of wine, which is made by mixing rice husks, sticky rice and leaven. The wine is drinkable after being stored in a jar for one to six months. A third type of wine is made from cooked potatoes, rice husks and leaven. This concoction must be stored in a jar for at least one month. A final cup of wine is produced from cooking maize with rice husks and leaven. This wine also must be stored for a month for its flavor to fully develop.

== See also ==
- Rượu cần, a similar wine drunk in Vietnam
- Lao-Lao, a similar wine drunk in Laos
