= Mijiu =

Chinese rice wine made from glutinous rice

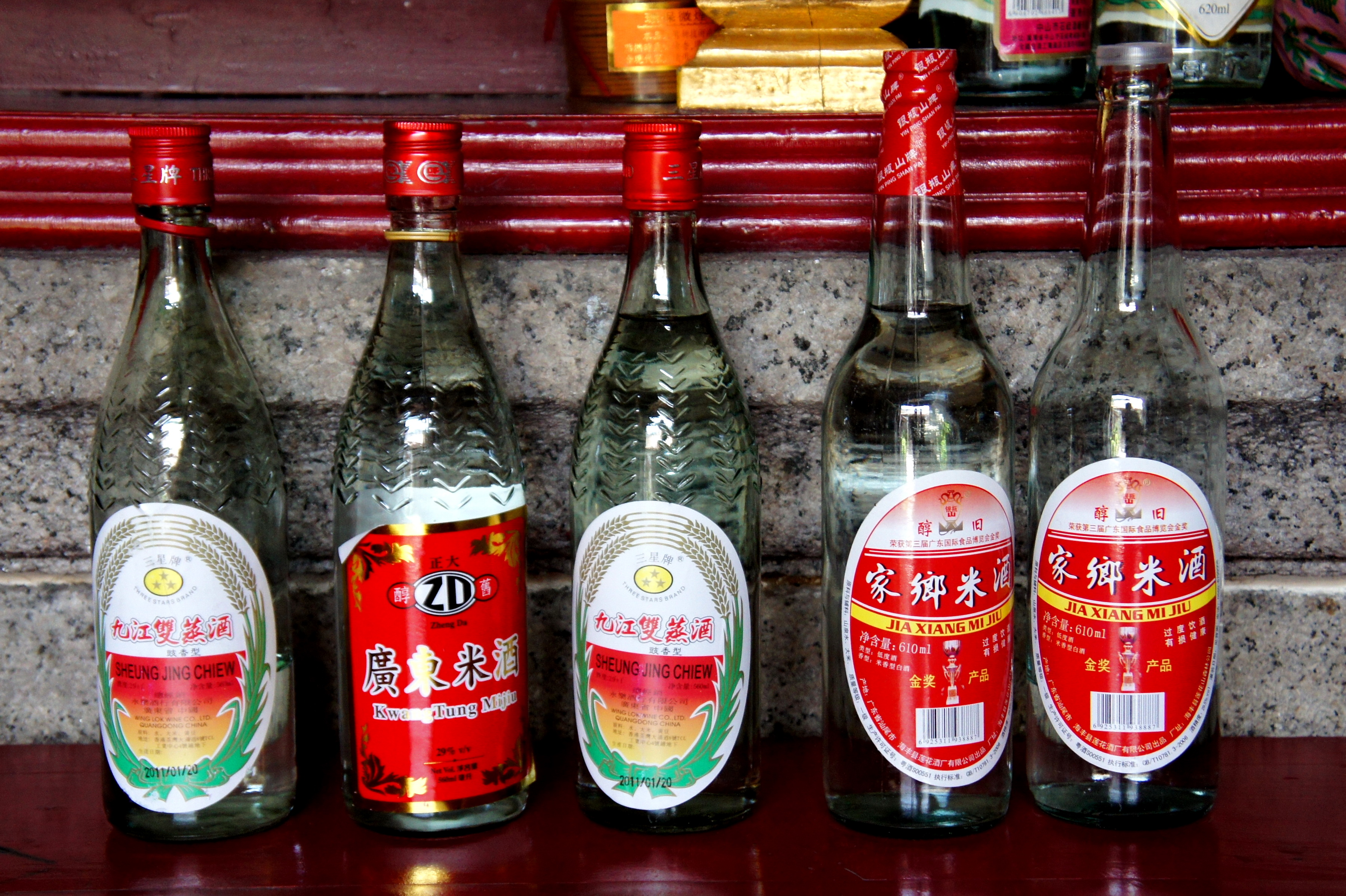
- Bottles of mijiu
- Type: Rice wine
- Origin: China, East Asia
- Alcohol by volume: 15%-20%
- Proof (US): 30-40
- Colour: Clear
- Ingredients: Glutinous rice
- Related products: Huangjiu, jiuniang, sake, cheongju

Mijiu
- Traditional Chinese: 米酒
- Simplified Chinese: 米酒
- Hakka: miˋ jiuˋ
Transcriptions
Standard Mandarin
- Hanyu Pinyin: mǐjiǔ
Hakka
- Romanization: miˋ jiuˋ

Mijiu (Chinese: 米酒; pinyin: mǐjiǔ; Wade–Giles: mi-chiu; lit. 'rice wine'), also spelled michiu, is a Chinese rice wine made from glutinous rice, with the alcohol content ranging between 15% and 20% v/v. It is generally clear in appearance with a balanced taste of sweetness and acidity, similar to its Japanese counterpart sake and Korean counterpart cheongju, and is usually drunk warm like sake and cheongju. A particularly popular category of mijiu is huangjiu or 'yellow wine'. An unfiltered form of mijiu containing whole rice grains is called jiǔniàng (酒酿) or láozāo (醪糟), with extremely low alcoholic content and often consumed by children. A type of baijiu (Chinese liquor) called rice baijiu (Chinese: 米白酒; pinyin: mǐ báijiǔ) is made via further distillation from mijiu.

Beverages similar to mijiu are noted on oracle inscriptions from the late Shang dynasty circa 1200–1046 B.C.E., and archaeological evidence confirms that the production of alcoholic beverages containing rice as part of a mix of fermentables (often including honey and/or fruit) dates back to over 8000 years ago. Rice wine production then spread to Korea, Japan, Vietnam, and other East Asian countries around the Sinosphere during the height of the Han and Tang dynasties. It played an important cultural role in historical Chinese life, with prominent poets such as Li Bai being some of the most famous drinkers. Although largely overtaken by the much stronger baijiu since the Mongol Yuan dynasty, mijiu is still a traditional beverage in parts of southern China and some of the families still follow the custom of homebrewing rice wine. It is sometimes served as an aperitif believed to be beneficial in improving metabolism and skin and is also frequently mixed with herbs and made into medicinal wines such as snake wine and dit da jow.

Today, mijiu is mainly produced and consumed in southern Mainland China and Taiwan. In Taiwan, the Taiwan Tobacco and Liquor Corporation (Monopoly Bureau) is the main manufacturer, branded as "Taiwan red label" with an alcohol content of 19.5%. Mijiu is also used frequently in Chinese cuisine as a cooking wine, commonly used in seafood and southern dishes such as ginger duck, drunken chicken, and three-cup chicken. The cooking mijiu available in Asian grocery stores are generally of lower quality and often contain added salt to avoid an alcohol tax.

== Usage ==
The traditional way to use mijiu is to boil three bottles and evaporate the alcohol while cooking with the chicken. It is believed that by using this recipe one can help women's rehabilitation wound. Mijiu is also used in Jiuniang which is a dish that consists of rice wine, rice particles, and sometimes glutinous rice balls.

== Dishes ==
Mijiu is used in Chinese desserts such as:

- Eggs spoiled in rice wine
- Sweet soup balls with rice wine
- Rice wine with brown sugar

== Gallery ==
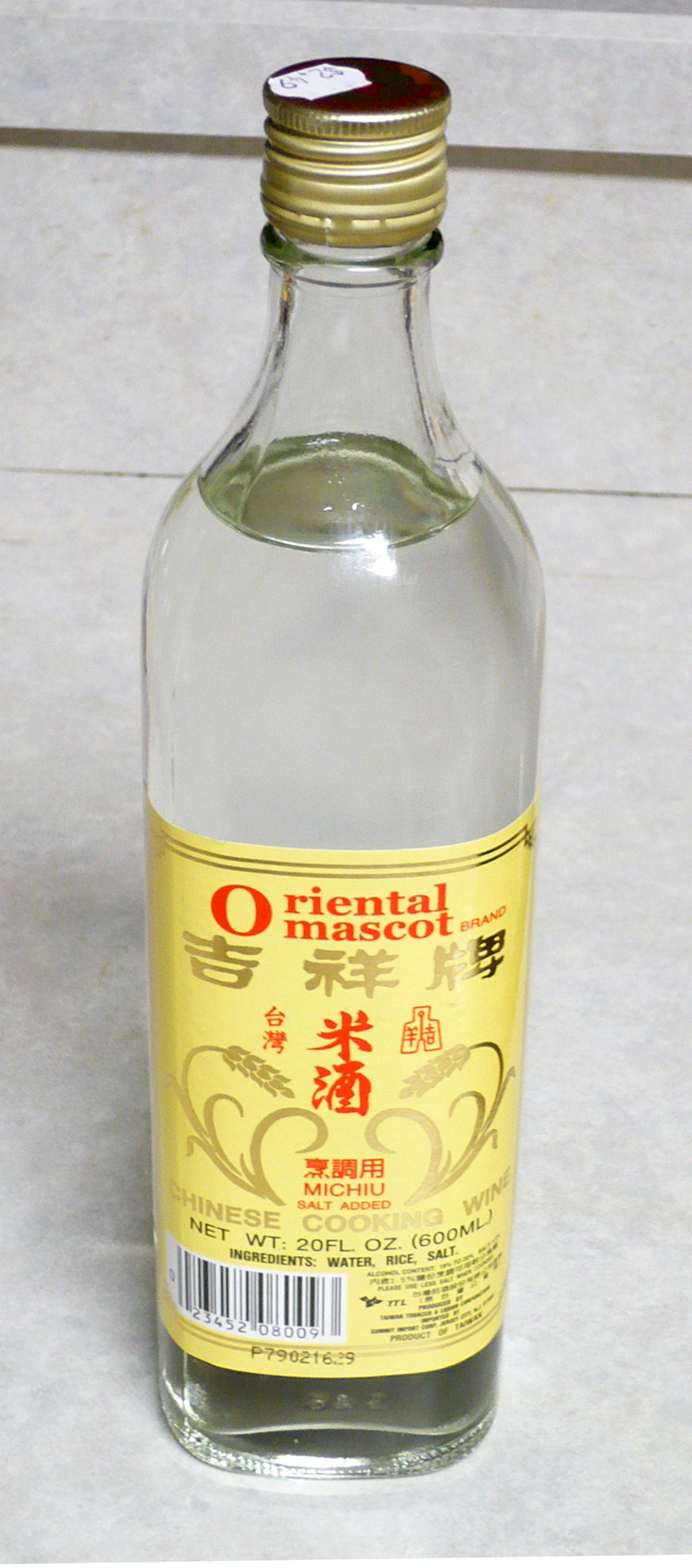
A bottle of Chinese cooking mijiu

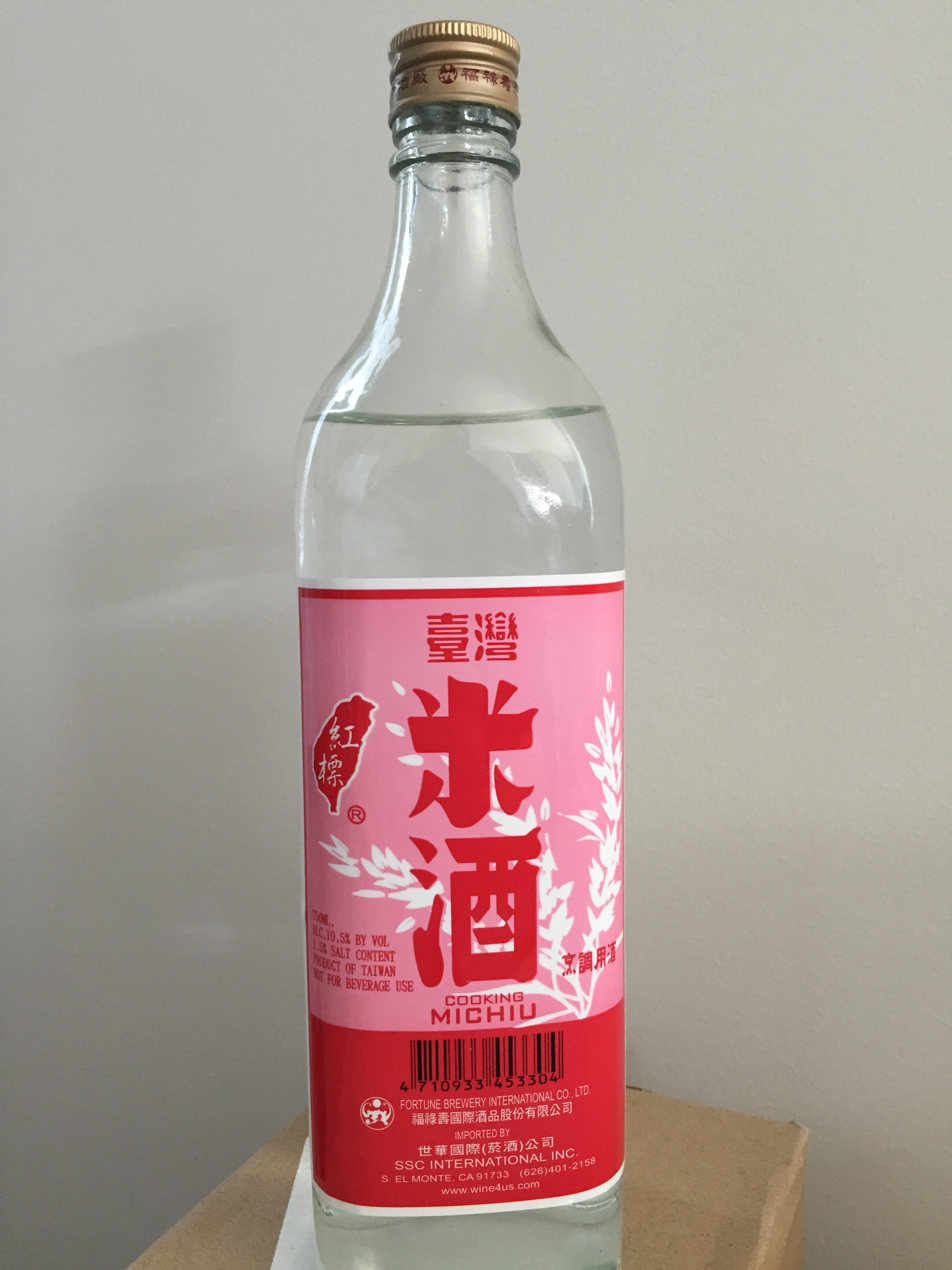
A bottle of Taiwanese mijiu

== See also ==
- Cheongju, a Korean equivalent
- Huangjiu, another type of Chinese wine made from rice
- Jiuniang
- Mirin
- Rice baijiu, a distilled alcohol made from rice
- Sake, a Japanese equivalent
