= Saccharification =

Chemical change wherein a sugar splits off a simple sugar

Saccharification is a term in biochemistry for denoting any chemical change wherein a monosaccharide molecule remains intact after becoming unbound from another saccharide. For example, when a carbohydrate is broken into its component sugar molecules by hydrolysis (e.g., sucrose being broken down into glucose and fructose).

Enzymes such as amylases (e.g. in saliva) and glycoside hydrolase (e.g. within the brush border of the small intestine) are able to perform exact saccharification through enzymatic hydrolysis. Through thermolysis, saccharification can also occur as a transient result, among many other possible effects, during caramelization.

== See also ==
- Glycosidic bond
- Glycoside hydrolase
- Gelation
