= Huangjiu =

Chinese alcoholic beverage

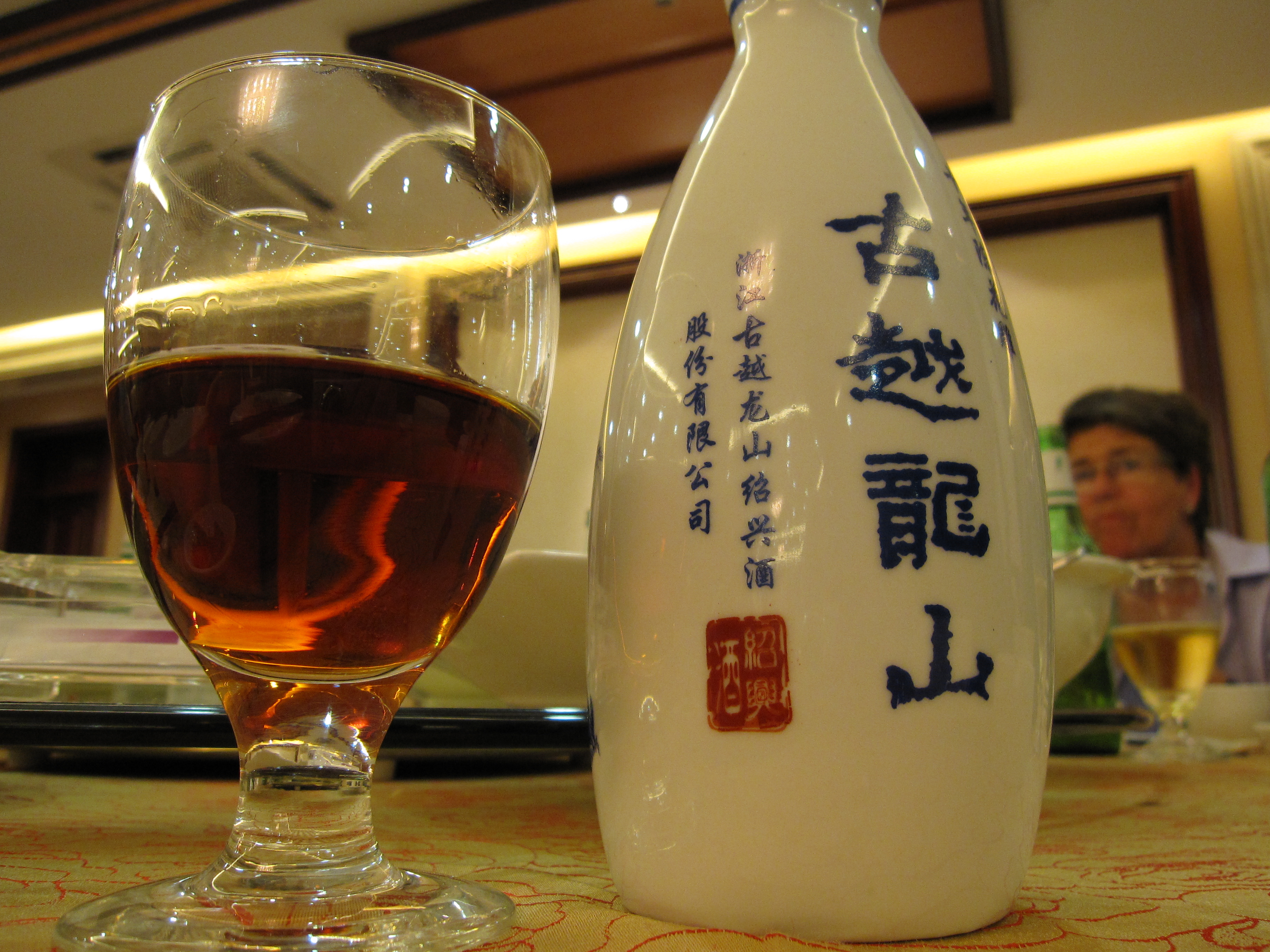
- A glass of Shaoxing wine, a variety of huangjiu
- Simplified Chinese: 黄酒
- Traditional Chinese: 黃酒
- Hanyu Pinyin: huángjiǔ
- Literal meaning: yellow wine
Transcriptions
Standard Mandarin
- Hanyu Pinyin: huángjiǔ
Southern Min
- Hokkien POJ: hông-chiú

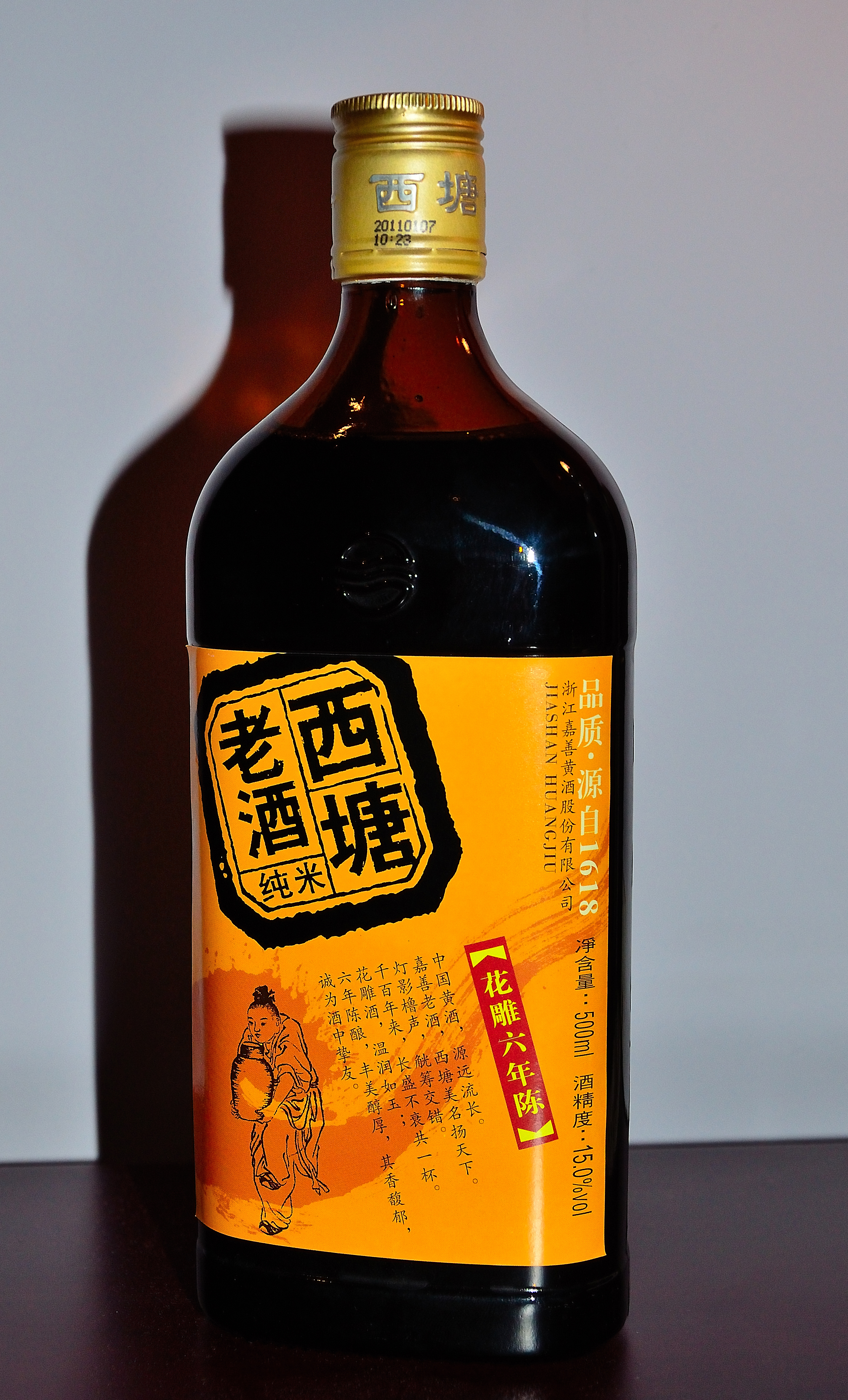
An example of the Huadiao jiu

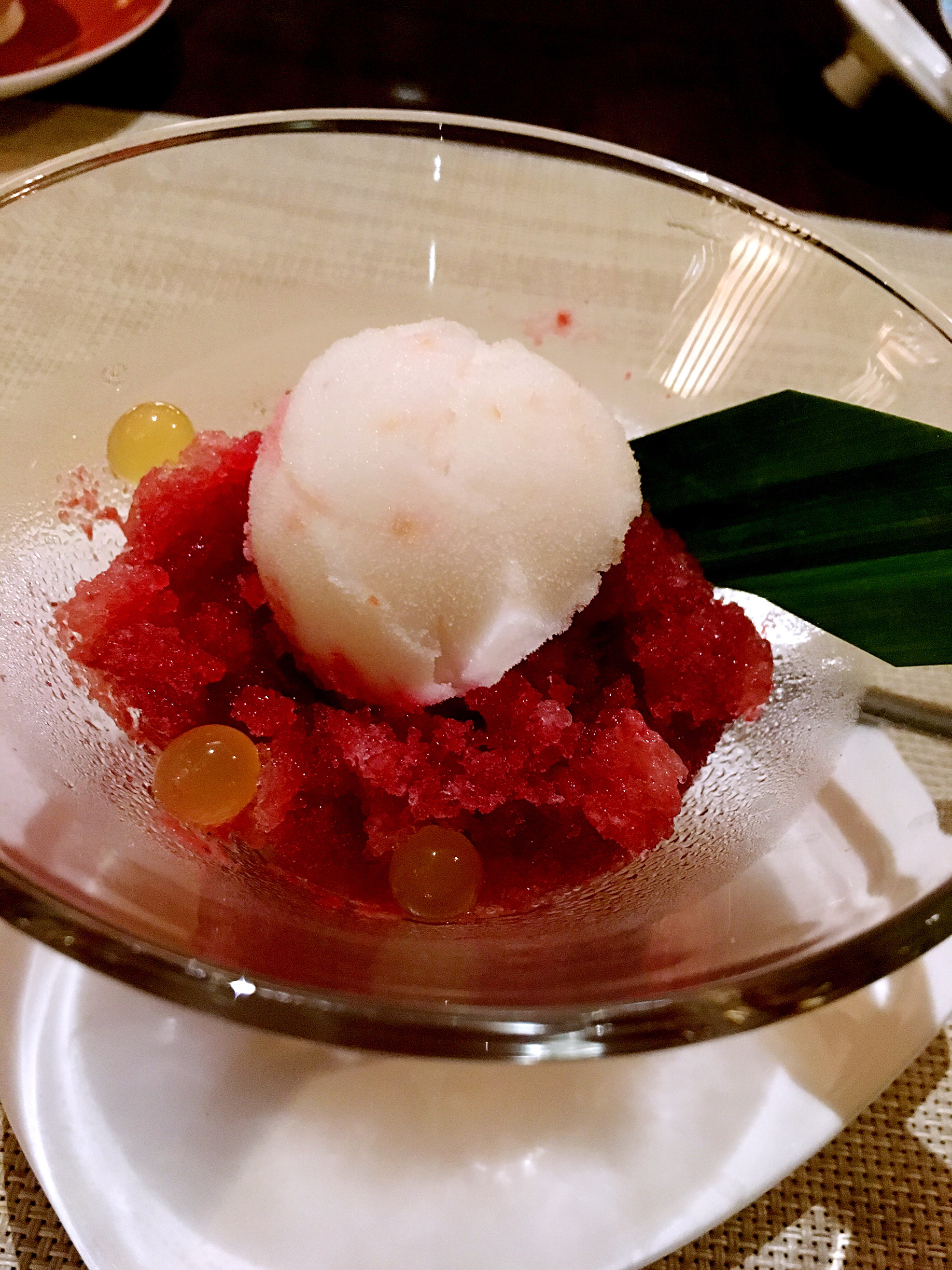
A dessert made of Nu'er hong and Kuei Hua Chen Chiew Cocktail Jelly

Huangjiu (Chinese: 黃酒; lit. 'yellow wine') is a type of Chinese rice wine (mijiu) most popular in East China. Huangjiu is brewed by mixing steamed grains including rice, glutinous rice or millet with qū as starter culture, followed by saccharification and fermentation at around 13–18 °C (55–64 °F) for fortnights. Its alcohol content is typically 8% to 20%.

Huangjiu is usually pasteurized, aged, and filtered before its final bottling for sale to consumers. The maturation process can be complicated but important for the development of the layers of flavors and fragrance. A few brands of premium grade huangjiu could have been aged for up to 20 years. As huangjiu's name suggests, its typical color is typically light yellow and orange, but it can in fact range from clear to brown. Many famous huangjiu brands promote the quality of water used in brewing in their advertising, and some consider it to be the most important ingredient.

The drink is commonly consumed warm, as the richness from the flavor compounds are released better when warm. In summer, it is popular to drink sweet huangjiu chilled or on ice. Liaojiu (Chinese: 料酒; lit. 'condiment wine') is a type of huangjiu used in cooking, an example of this being the liaojiu-type of Shaoxing rice wine. Major producers of huangjiu include mainland China and Taiwan.

== History ==
Huangjiu in Chinese society had perhaps the same level of influence as beer in the European societies throughout history. Archeology has established that ancient Chinese people once brewed some form of alcohol similar to beer in China, however with the invention of the brewing method using qu, huangjiu rapidly replaced the prototypic beer in ancient China and beer-like beverages fell out of fashion as the ancient Chinese drinkers preferred tastes of huangjiu. As beer was completely forgotten in China until the 19th century, when the Germans reintroduced a brewery in Qingdao (then romanized as Tsingtao) which later became the producer of today's famous Tsingtao beer, huangjiu has always been the nation's favorite type of brewed alcoholic beverage (whereas baijiu has been the nation's favorite spirit or liquor).

The earliest form of huangjiu was supposedly devized by Du Kang during the reign of Shaokang of the Xia. Dukang was subsequently deified as the Chinese god of wine. His son Heita is sometimes said to have accidentally invented Zhenjiang vinegar when his forgetfulness allowed a vat to spoil.

Today, huangjiu has a great presence throughout China, especially in the Jiangnan area. Most well-known huangjiu varieties include Guyue longshan, Kuaijishan and Tapai from Shaoxing, Huiquan jiu from Wuxi.

== Huangjiu varieties ==
Huangjiu is produced widely throughout China, in a variety of styles, which reflect the wine's sugar content, the starter/innoculent (or qu) used, and its production method.

=== Dryness/Sweetness ===
This is the formal classification for all Chinese wines. There are five categories: dry, semidry, semisweet, sweet, and extra-sweet.

- Dry (Gan, 乾): with sugar content no greater than 1%. This type of rice wine has the lowest fermentation temperature. An example of this kind is Yuanhongjiu (元紅酒, literally "Champion's Red Wine"), a specialty of Shaoxing, so-named because being successful in the imperial examination is a great cause for celebration and fame (red) and as well, traditionally the wine jars are painted red.
- Semidry (Ban Gan, 半乾): with sugar content between 1% and 3%. This type of huangjiu can be stored for a long period of time and encompasses most of the varieties of huangjiu that are exported from China. An example of this variety is Jiafanjiu (加飯酒, literally "Added Rice Wine"), a variation on the Yuanhongjiu that involves adding more rice in fermentation. The jiafanjiu is traditionally used for ceremonies, such as child birth, engagement, and funerals.
- Semisweet (Ban Tian, 半甜): with sugar content between 3% and 10%. The longer the semisweet huangjiu is stored, the darker its color becomes. This variety of huangjiu cannot be stored for long periods of time. An example of this kind is Shanniangjiu (善酿酒, literally "Best Made Wine"), a specialty of Shaoxing which partly uses vintage Yuanhongjiu instead of water.
- Sweet (Tian, 甜): with sugar content between 10% and 20%. An example of this variety is Feng Gang Jiu (封缸酒, literally "Conceal Earth Jar Wine"). In comparison to previous types of huangjiu, sweet huangjiu can be manufactured all year round when using traditional production methods.
- Extra-sweet (Nong Tian, 浓甜): with sugar content equal or greater than 20%. An example of this variety is Xiang Xue Jiu (香雪酒, literally "Fragrant Snow Wine").

=== Starter/Inoculant ===
- Xiaoqu (小曲 / 小麴; pinyin: xiǎo qū, "small yeast"): Wines inoculated using rice cultured with Rhizopus, yeast, and other microorganisms. The mixture generates less heat, so they are mostly used in southern China.
- Daqu (酒曲 / 酒麴; pinyin: jiǔ qū, "alcohol yeast"): Wines inoculated using rice cultured with Aspergillus oryzae and yeast. Almost all popular alcoholic drinks in China belong to this type.
- Hongqu (红曲 / 紅麴; pinyin: hóng qū, "red yeast"): Wines that are flavored and colored with Monascus purpureus or other red rice molds of the genus Monascus.

=== Production methods ===
- Tangfan (烫饭 / 燙飯; pinyin: tàng fàn, "warm rice"): The steamed rice used to make the wine is cooled in the open air until it is still relatively warm before processing.
- Liangfan (凉饭 / 凉飯; pinyin: liáng fàn, "cold rice"): The steamed rice used to make the wine is quenched with cold water before further processing. The unfiltered mash for this wine is sometimes eaten as a dessert or used as an inoculant for other Chinese wines.
- Jiafan (加飯 or 餵飯; pinyin: jiā fàn or wèi fàn, "fed rice"): Steamed rice is continuously fed into a fermenting mixture (up to three times), which produces a sweeter wine.
- Fortified: Baijiu is added to the fermenting mash, which increases the concentration of alcohol in the mash and halts the fermentation process. This leaves a significant quantity of unfermented sugars, thus producing an especially sweet tasting wine.

== Types ==
Some of the most popular huangjiu include:

- Mijiu (米酒; pinyin: mǐjiǔ) is the generic name for Chinese fermented rice wine, similar to Japanese sake. It is generally clear, and is used for both drinking and cooking. Mijiu intended for cooking is generally of lower grade and often contains 1.5% salt. The alcohol content by volume of mijiu is typically 12–19.5%.
- Fujian Laojiu (福建老酒)
- Su-shi Laojiu (蘇式老酒, "Su-style old wine"): Huiquan jiu is iconic of this type of huangjiu.
- Fujian Nuomijiu (福建糯米酒; pinyin: Fújiàn nuòmǐ jiǔ): made by adding a long list of expensive Chinese medicinal herbs to glutinous rice and a low alcohol distilled rice wine. The unique brewing technique uses another wine as raw material, instead of starting with water. The wine has an orange-red color. Alcohol content by volume: 18%.
- Jiafan jiu (加飯酒)
- Huadiao jiu (花雕酒; pinyin: huādiāo jiǔ; lit. "flowery carving wine"), also known as nu'er hong (女兒紅; pinyin: nǚ'ér hóng, lit. "daughter red"): a variety of huangjiu that originates from Shaoxing, in the eastern coastal province of Zhejiang. It is made of glutinous rice and wheat. This wine evolved from the Shaoxing tradition of burying nu'er hong underground when a daughter was born, and digging it up for the wedding banquet when the daughter was to be married. The containers would be decorated with bright colors as a wedding gift. To make the gift more appealing, people began to use pottery with flowery carvings and patterns. Huadiao jiu's alcohol content is 16% by volume.
- Shaoxing jiu (紹興酒; pinyin: Shàoxīng jiǔ) It is commonly used both for drinking and in Chinese cooking (as liaojiu, with added herbs and spices). The reddish color of these wines is imparted by red yeast rice. One prominent producer of Shaoxing wine is Zhejiang Guyue Longshan Shaoxing Wine Co., Ltd. (古越龍山) of Shaoxing, Zhejiang. It is not uncommon for some varieties of Shaoxing wine to be aged for 50 years or more.
- Honglu jiu (紅露酒; pinyin: hóng lù jiǔ; lit. "red wine") is produced in Taiwan, while Shaoxing wine is made in Fujian Province. In the 1910s, three businessmen produced Chinese red rice wine aged longer than other manufacturers in Taiwan by using higher ratio of glutinous rice content. They branded their top and the second grade products as 老紅金雞, or literary Golden Rooster, and 老紅酒黃雞, or literary Yellow Rooster. After World War II, Yellow Rooster was renamed as Hong lu jiu.
- Liaojiu (料酒; pinyin: liàojiǔ; lit. "ingredient wine") is a lower grade of huangjiu widely used in Chinese cuisine as a cooking wine. Often it is sold flavored and seasoned with various herbs, such as cloves, star anise, cassia, black cardamom, Sichuan pepper, ginger, nutmeg, and salt.

== Production ==
=== Ingredients ===
The three main ingredients of Chinese alcoholic beverages are the grain, water, and qu. Other ingredients may also be added to alter the color, taste, or medicinal properties of the final product.

During their creation, storage, or presentation, Chinese alcoholic beverages may be flavored or seasoned. Use of fruit is rare, particularly compared with Korean wines, but medicinal herbs, flowers, and spices are much more common. Well-known examples include cassia wine (flavored with sweet osmanthus blossoms and consumed during the Mid-Autumn Festival) and realgar wine (dosed with a small amount of arsenic sulfide and consumed during the Dragon Boat Festival).

==== Grains ====
The earliest grains domesticated in China were millet in the north and rice in the south. Both are still employed in production of alcohol. Modern production also employs wheat, barley, sorghum, and coixseed.

For huangjiu, the grains are degermed and polished of their bran. They are then soaked and acidified with the aid of lactobacillus or through the addition of lactic acid into the soaking liquid. (Acidification is done to discourage the growth of other microbes on the grains, which can spoil the resulting liquor by creating undesired flavors in it or rendering it poisonous.) This process produces a taste and mouth-feel distinct from other forms of rice wine.

==== Water ====
Water hydrates the grains and enables fermentation. The pH and mineral content of the water also contribute to the flavor and quality of the drink. Many regions are famous not only for their alcoholic beverages but also for the flavor and quality of their water sources. Emphasis is placed on gathering the cleanest water directly from springs or streams or from the center of lakes, where the water has been exposed to the least amount of pollutants. Water should be low in iron and sodium, with a higher proportion of magnesium and calcium ions as part of its total mineral content.

==== Starter ====
The fermentation starter, known in Chinese as jiuqu or simply as qu, is usually a dried cake of flour cultured with various molds, yeasts and bacteria. In the production of huangjiu it is crushed and added to inoculate the cereal substrate to initiate fermentation into liquor. The various molds and filamentous yeasts found in qu exude enzymes that digest the substrate into sugars that are in turn, fermented into alcohol by other yeasts and bacteria.

There are three main types of starters:

- Xiaoqu (小曲 / 小麴) or Small Starter, a small cake (10-100g) of rice flour (or if wheat flour, termed Maiqu), cultured with microbes and incubated for a short period at relatively cool temperatures. The dominant starter for huangjiu.
- Daqu (大曲 / 大麴) or Large Starter, a large cake (1–5 kg) of wheat, wheat and pea, or barley and wheat flour, cultured with microbes and incubated for a longer period at relatively high temperatures. The dominant starter for Baijiu, but often used in huangjiu in combination with Xiaoqu. Its use will significantly alter the organoleptic qualities of the ensuing wine.
- Hongqu (红曲 / 紅麴) or Red Starter, are dried, mold-encrusted rice grains cultured with microbes, The dominant mold, Monascus purpureus, creates a red pigment which colors the ensuing liquor in shades or red to purple. Often used in conjunction with Xiaoqu to make red cereal wines.

=== Preparation ===
==== Seed mash ====
Prior to the actual brewing of the liquor, another small batch of grain is prepared to produce the "seed mash" (酒母, jiǔmǔ). Seed mash is produced by soaking and acidifying glutinous rice and other grains, then steaming them on frames or screens for several minutes. This cooks the grains and converts their starch into a gelatinized form that is more easily utilized by the starter culture. The inoculation temperature of the steamed grains is tightly controlled as it alters the flavor character. This is usually done when the grain has been doused with cold water and cooled to between 23 and 28 °C, which is considered the optimal initial fermentation temperature for the seed mash.

After the little starter is added, it is allowed around two days to begin the saccharification, acidification, and fermentation of the grains. Inoculation with the first starter partially liquifies the steamed grains, which is the signal to add the big starter as well as more water to form a thick slurry. This slurry is carefully stirred by a brewmaster to aerate and maintain an optimal level of oxygen and carbon dioxide in the mixture, as well as to maintain an even temperature throughout the fermenting mass. The slurry is periodically stirred over the course of a week. The stirred slurry is then allowed to go through a more thorough fermentation for approximately one month, following which the pH drops to around 3.4 and the alcohol content rises to approximately 15%. This is the seed mash that will be used to brew the main mash.

==== Main mash ====
More soaked and acidified rice is prepared in the same fashion as in the seed mash. The grain is then either cooled with cold water or left out on a flat surface, depending on the type of huangjiu being produced, as the cooling method alters the flavor and mouth-feel of the resulting drink. The seed mash, an additional big starter, and fresh water is then mixed into this grain in large, glazed earthenware pots up to 2 meters (6 ft 7 in) in diameter and height. The mixture is pounded on the sides of the pots.

==== Aging ====
Similar to the production of Japanese sake, saccharification and fermentation usually happen in the same mash concurrently, as the seed mash and starter act on the cooked rice. The mixture is then left to mature in earthenware jars for a length of time from several months to several decades before being bottled and sold.

==== Variations ====
Northern breweries often use three big starters rather than an initial little starter. Large factories typically employ air blowers to cool the second batch of grain rather than using cold water or leaving it out to cool.

The brewery may also separate the saccharification and fermentation of the grain, similar to brewing. If this is desired, the seed mash is typically not used, since a main mash will never be produced. Instead, a mash of water, steamed glutinous rice, and other grains is inoculated with rice that has already been cultivated with the mold Aspergillus oryzae or molds of the genus Rhizopus and certain strains of Lactobacillus. When mixed into the mash, the molds cultivate the mixture and convert the starch in the grains into sugar and lactic acid. This sweet and slightly sour liquid is drained and reserved, while additional water (and sometimes also malt) is added to the mixture. The process is repeated until the grains are exhausted. Yeast is then added to this liquid in order to convert the sugars in the liquid to alcohol.

== Gallery ==
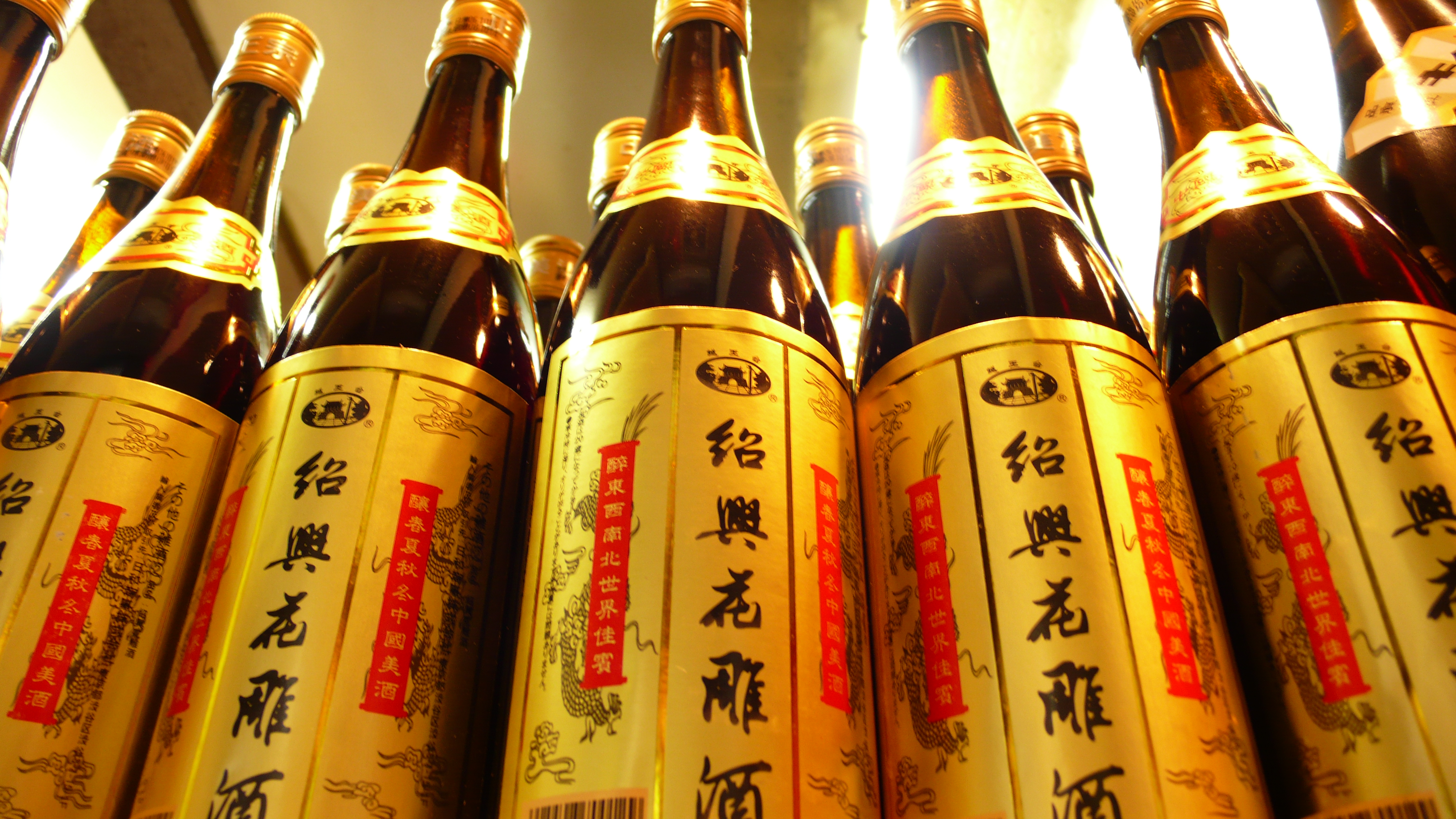
Bottles of Shaoxing wine (紹興酒)

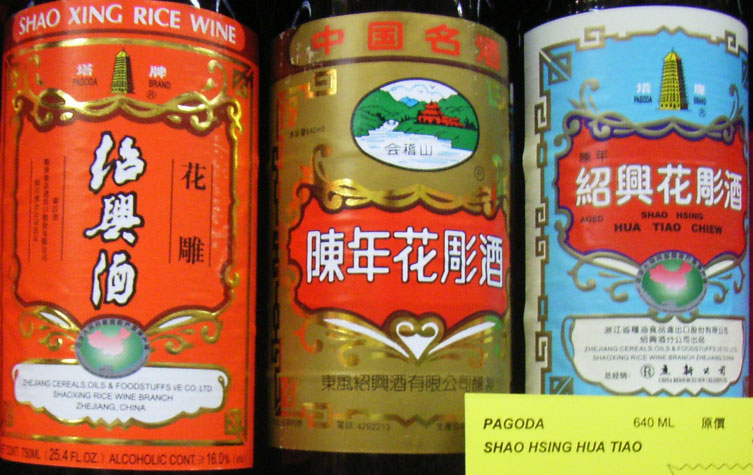
Bottles of Huadiao jiu (花雕酒)

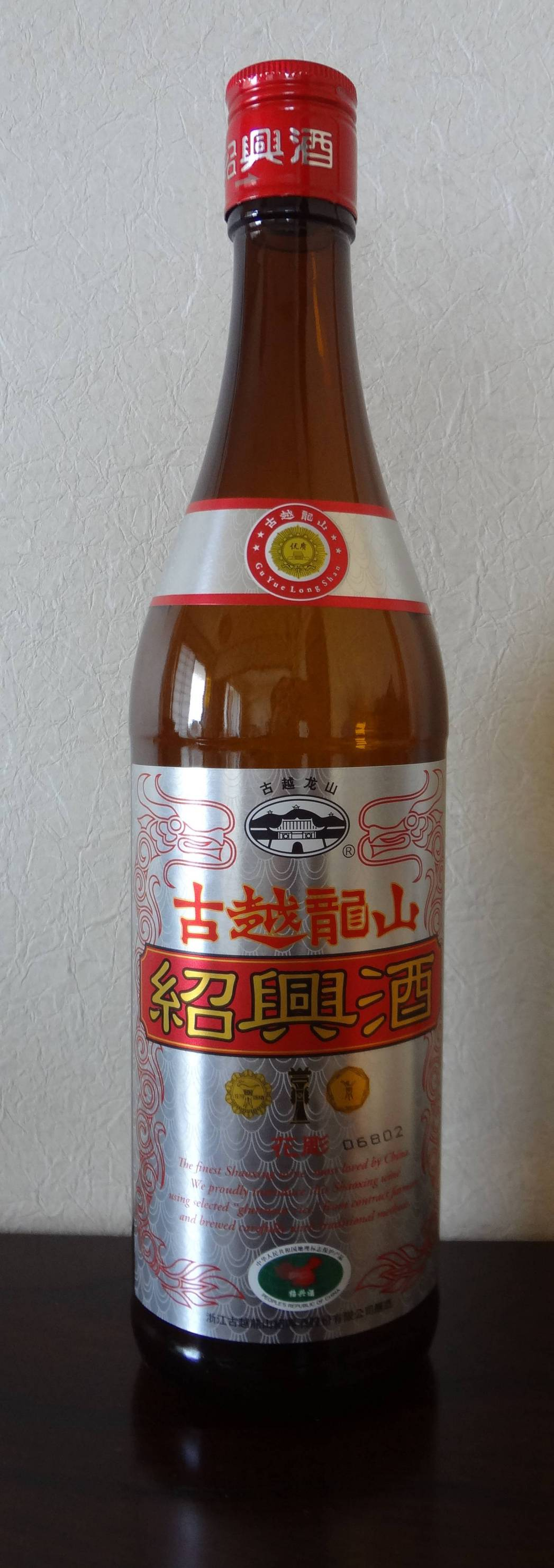
A bottle of Guyue Longshan (古越龍山) Shaoxing wine

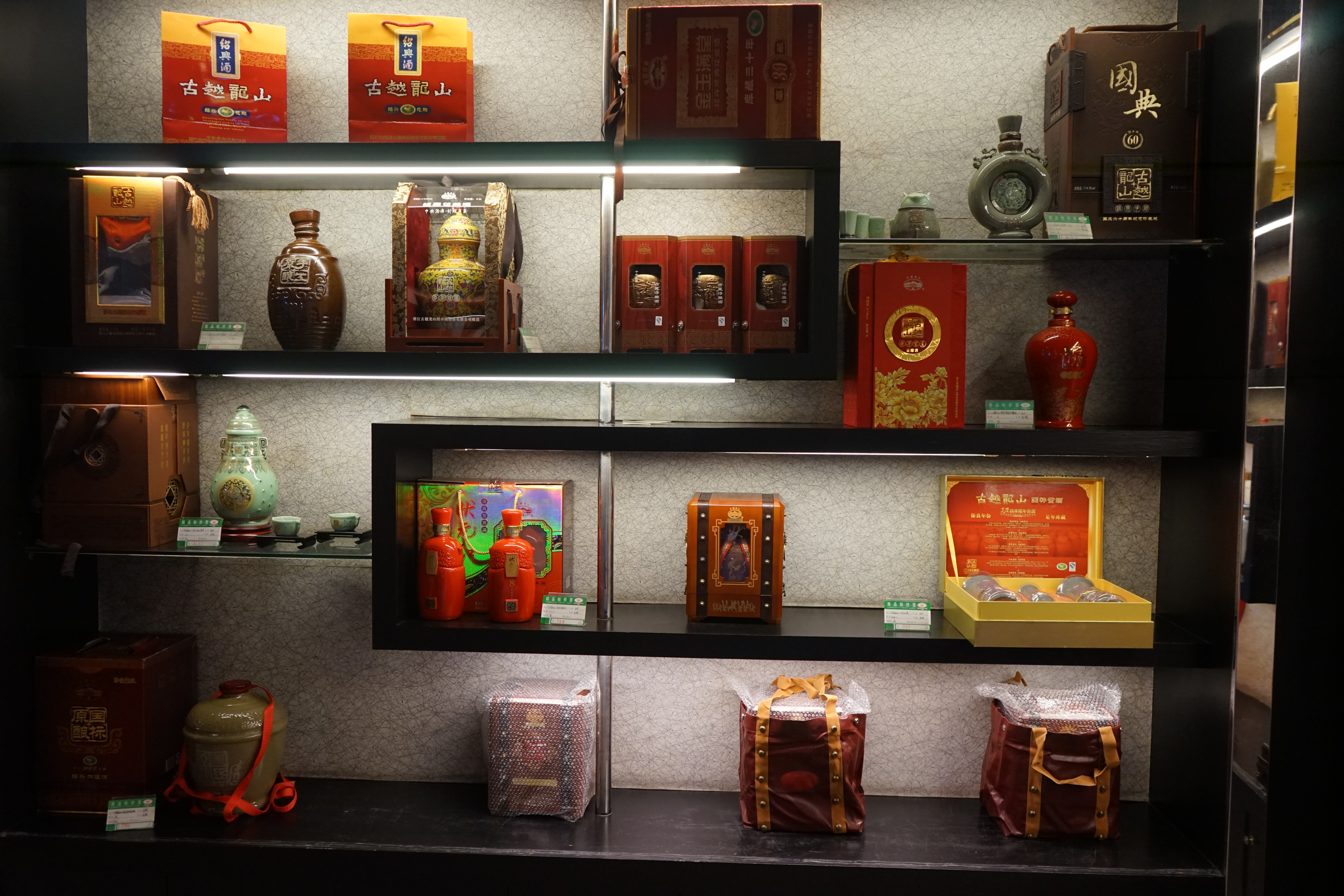
Various products by Guyue Longshan

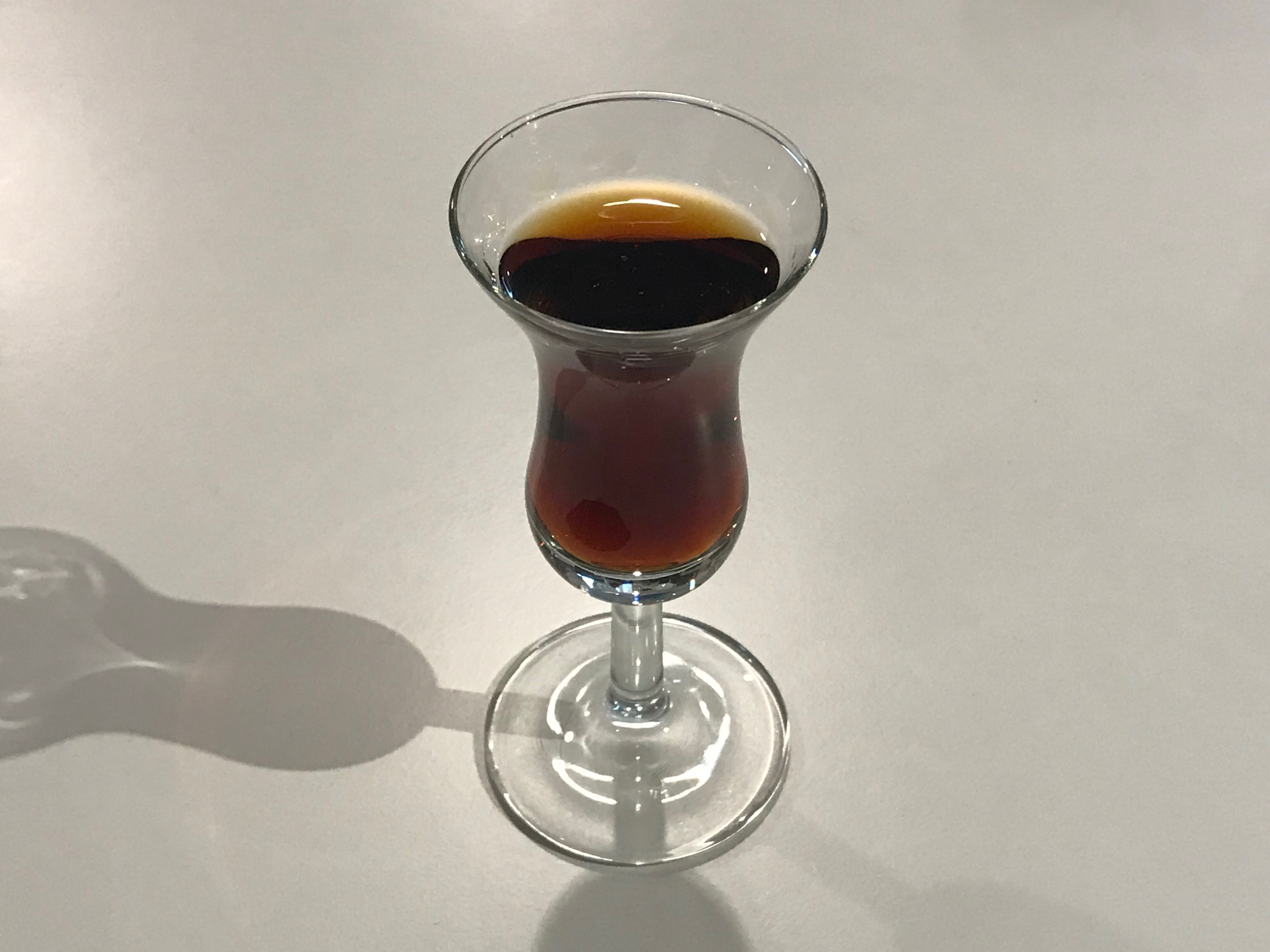
A glass of Shaoxing wine

== See also ==
- Choujiu
- Mijiu
- Baijiu
- Chinese alcoholic beverages
- Realgar wine
- Sake
- Cheongju
