= Jiuqu =

East Asian fermentation starter

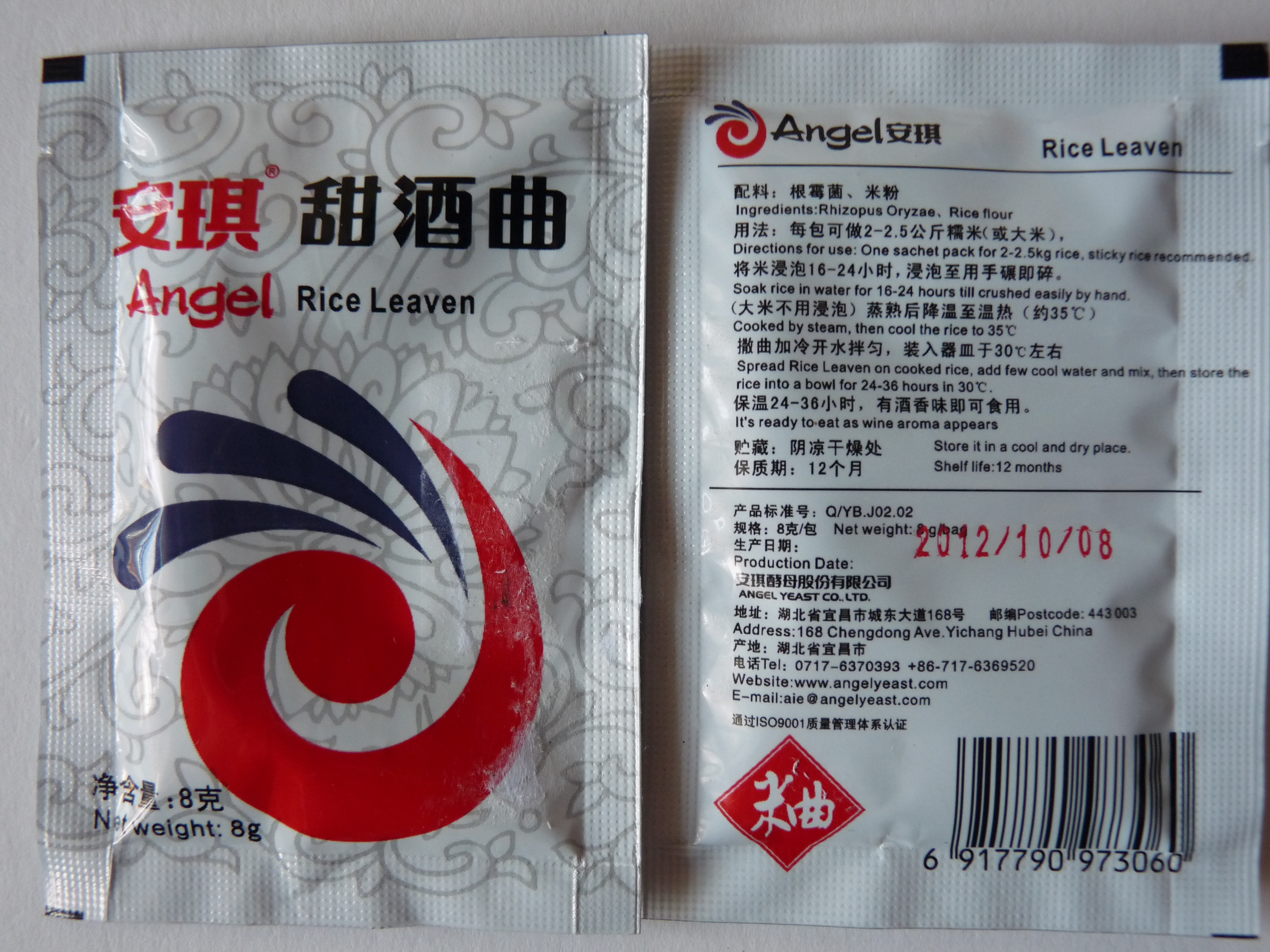
- Packets of jiuqu
- Traditional Chinese: 酒麴
- Simplified Chinese: 酒曲
- Literal meaning: liquor yeast
Transcriptions
Standard Mandarin
- Hanyu Pinyin: jiǔqū

Qunie
- Traditional Chinese: 麴櫱
- Simplified Chinese: 曲蘖
- Literal meaning: yeast and malt
Transcriptions
Standard Mandarin
- Hanyu Pinyin: qūniè

Jiumu
- Chinese: 酒母
- Literal meaning: liquor origin
Transcriptions
Standard Mandarin
- Hanyu Pinyin: jiǔmǔ

Jiuqu (Chinese: 酒曲; lit. 'liquor yeast'), also simply known as qu, (Note: qū in mainland China, and qú in Taiwan) is a type of dried fermentation starter used in the production of traditional Chinese alcoholic beverages. The word jiuqu specifically refers to a type of yeast (曲; 麴; qū) used to make alcohol (酒; jiǔ) such as huangjiu (cereal wine), baijiu (distilled spirits) and jiuniang (alcoholic rice pudding).

Other forms of starters are used for different fermentations, such as soy sauce, rice vinegar, fermented bean curd, and paste. The starter culture for these foods are also known as qu.Jiuqu is similar to, but distinct from, the more widely known Japanese starter known as koji.

The starter creation process in China traditionally took place in homes, villages, or small manufacturing facilities, later shifting to large-scale facilities.

== History ==
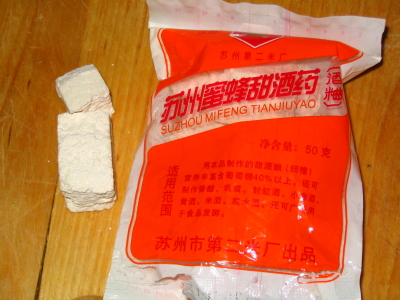
Fermentation starter, known as jiǔyào (酒藥)

In China, particular cultivars of jiuqu are known as "starter cake" (曲饼; 麴餅; qūbǐng), "liquor product" (酒药; 酒藥; jiǔyào), or simply as qu. Qū is known as nuruk in Korea, much or marcha in India and Nepal, banh men in Vietnam, pacing in Laos, loog pang in Thailand, Ta-Say in Myanmar, mae domba in Cambodia, ragi in Indonesia and Malaysia, and bubo in the Philippines. The tradition of making qū is believed to have originated in China 3000–4000 years ago, and introduced throughout East Asia, Southeast Asia, and South Asia.

Qu is mentioned in the Book of Documents, one of the Five Classics of ancient Chinese literature and a foundational work in Confucianism. A book from the Shang dynasty (c. 17th–11th centuries BC) states that "to make wine or sweet liquor one needs qū nieh". Most authorities concur that qū describes the preparation of ferments, while nieh refers to sprouted grain. They may have formed separate elements of liquor production (both qū and nieh) or might refer to a single preparation made of fermenting sprouted grains (qu nigh). The Book of Documents predates 500 BC, so the ancient predecessor of qū may be the world's oldest example of biotechnological manufacturing.

Qu is mentioned in the Zhouli (c. 150 BC), a collection of texts from the Eastern Zhou dynasty. It is described in preparing fermented meat and a grain–meat paste. At Mawangdui (200 BC – 10 AD), bamboo strips in Han Tomb Number 1 documented an inventory of tomb contents that included two sacks of qu. The Liji (100 AD), a collection of texts from the Eastern Han dynasty, mentions qū as one of six requisites to make good wine. Another almanac from the Eastern Han dynasty, the first-century AD Shuowen Jiezi records a character for qū modified to include the yellow chrysanthemum flower. This was interpreted as referring to the distinctive yellow color formed on qū by sporulating molds. The Shiming (151) mentions several types of qu, which are interpreted as distinguished by the source of the starch and the form of the substrate. It claims that since the Han dynasty qū was produced in China from mostly wheat or barley and pressed into cakes or bricks for handling. The earliest reference to the actual preparation of qū appears in the Qimin yaoshu (544) of the Northern Wei dynasty. There the techniques employed for making nine separate kinds of qū nigh are described in detail, along with their usage in the manufacture of 37 wines. The usage of qū in making vinegar, soybean pastes, and soy sauces are documented. The Qing yilu (清异录, 965) recorded the use of a special red starter for the first time.

The fourth-century Nanfang Caomu Zhuang has the earliest description of preparing a natural "herb ferment" with rice, used to make a special wine for marriage ceremonies. "In [Nanhai, in Guangzhou] there are many fine wines, prepared not with yeast leaven but by pounding rice flour mixed with many kinds of herb leaves and soaked in the juice of Gelsemium elegans (冶葛; yěgé). The dough, the size of an egg, is left in dense bushes under the shade. After a month, it is done and is used to mix with glutinous rice to make wine. Therefore, when consumed in large quantities, occurs, hot and sweaty head even after the effects of intoxication have subsided, as the drink contains toxic herbs. The roots of yege are poisonous."

== Production ==
Making qu involves cultivating microbes in starchy materials and is a separate process that precedes the fermentation of grains and legumes into food or alcoholic beverages. Traditional practices vary and diverge from the later processes used for industrially-produced qu.

The major manufacturing principles are:

- Preparation of cereal grains, usually rice, or a dough made from them
- Inoculation with previously grown microbiota (generally 4–8% mass)
- Incubation in a warm, humid environment for a set duration to stimulate the growth and metabolism of the microbiota
- Desiccation to preserve the functional properties

Qu can be sold fresh or stored for up to three years, without significant loss of viability.

Substrate ingredients vary across China by regional preferences, availability, and the type of qu ultimately being produced. The most common flours used in daqu are wheat and barley/peas. The preparation of hong involves only whole rice grains. Herbs of many kinds are variously included in the rice dough of many xiao preparations.

Traditional methods have changed little since the publication of the Qimin Yaoshu (544 CE). Grains or flours are saturated with water (e.g., steaming rice or mixing flour with water to form a dough) and subsequently incubated in a warm, humid environment during a favorable season, typically spring or autumn. No inocula are used, but often herbs are added. To keep the grains or dough relatively moist and warm, they are housed in closed straw-roofed huts and typically kept in straw baskets, stacked on wooden shelves, or simply placed on the floor. Leaves of various plants, often straw, mulberry leaves or Artemisia, are used to wrap or cover the qu to promote a beneficial condition. The presses and molds used to shape the dough are made of wood. All of these elements unknowingly provided access to the microbes. The cakes are deemed ready when a colored coating forms on the outside. They are then dried and stored until used. The control of moisture and temperature levels and a lack of atmospheric access was recognized as vital to making consistently good qu as early as the Qimin Yaoshu.

One aspect that has changed is the method of re-culturing for later preparation. Traditionally, microbes indigenous to the raw material, the process, and the locale simply grew upon the grains or dough. At some stage in history, it was discovered that using small amounts (2–8% mass) of a previous successful batch to inoculate the current one gave more consistent results. The starter cultures are often handed down from generation to generation in a continuous cycle of serial re-culturing. The most important functional organisms in qu have been recognized as the filamentous molds Aspergillus and Rhizopus, which reproduce only asexually through spores called conidia, so an important step in manufacturing is to allow some of the cultured substrate to mature and sporulate to inoculate the next batch. Most of the other microbes present are capable of vegetative budding (yeasts) or binary fission (bacteria) and propagate without intervention.

The incubation and maturation phase is a typical biomolecule manufacturing process using solid-state fermentation. Yeasts and bacteria are often used in industrial submerged fermentation because they thrive at high water activity and reduced oxygen levels. Molds, however, prefer the lower water content and increased oxygen found in solid-state fermentation. The steaming of grain or making of dough creates a solid substrate with reduced water activity. Thus, the actual technique passed down through history unknowingly favored the growth and reproduction of the mold genera, organisms capable of excreting large amounts of functional enzymes onto their substrate. The qu itself became a dried product carrying both microbes and their enzymes (the biomolecules). Most yeast and bacteria do not find the conditions of qu optimal, but still grow effectively in solid-state fermentation. Their relationships to qū are not well understood.

Qu processing can be carried out synchronously in the factory or workplace that produces a fermented end-product (such as a brewery or soy sauce factory) or it can be produced independently for sale. Traditionally, breweries did not make qu, but later often specialized in the preparation. Qu manufacturing techniques still vary widely, with each brewery or factory using a slightly different process and locally indigenous microflora, which in turn have generated diverse strains across China.

The process of making industrialized qu is inherently more complex as the two end products are sought to be manufactured by the factory: qu for use in alcohol production and so-called 'seed' qu for continued culturing of the microbiota. Seed qu is a pre-production process tailored to suit the growth and subsequent reproductive cycle of select microbes.

As such, qu practices have evolved from:

- Non-inoculum, spontaneous growth of microbiota from the natural surroundings through to
- Inoculation with a previous batch to improve consistency, culminating in
- Industrial culturing in a special process

A fourth step was introduced in 21st century China, where aseptic laboratory conditions are used to mono-culture specific favorable strains of mold, yeast, and bacteria grown on independent, fortified substrates. Such isolates now find usage in biotechnology applications such as fuel ethanol or enzyme production. An important objective is continued research into the biotechnological domestication of such microbes and as such, standardization of qu preparation.

== Functions ==
The advantage of using qū for alcohol production is its two-fold effect. The enzymes and microorganisms break down the starches and sugars, reducing the process of making grain spirits to one step. The use of microbial cultured starches for fermentation has a long history in East Asian countries, as evidenced by the diversity of foods and beverages produced. Brewing alcoholic beverages from grains typically involves the use of sprouted cereal grains that supply natural enzymes to break down carbohydrates, proteins, and lipids.

Traditional East Asian alcoholic fermentations use raw and unsprouted (unmalted) grains. Such grains lack the enzymes responsible for the conversion of carbohydrates to fermentable sugars and thus fermentation cannot proceed. Culturing microbes on cereal grains is a time-honored tradition in East Asia and the necessary way to solve this limitation, as they exude the enzymes that allow liquefaction and saccharification to occur (up to fifty different enzymes have been isolated from Aspergillus oryzae starters). Their mutualistic symbiosis with fermentative yeast and bacteria initiates the complex saccharification-liquefaction-fermentation process to produce the final alcoholic beverage.

Qū, in ground form, is directly applied to cooked grain at a temperature suitable for microbe growth. When rehydrated, any enzymes present become activated. However, due to the small amount of qū used (2–8%) in most cases, only a minor contribution of enzymes comes from the starter. As such, qū is used only to inoculate the mash with microbes. In the case of baijiu production, typical amounts of 15–25% qū are used, sometimes reaching as high as 50%, which consequently provides a major enzyme contribution to the mash to initiate catabolism. The exponential growth and reproduction of microbes after inoculation releases more enzymes in the process, inducing further catabolism, to produce poly- and mono-saccharides, amino acids, peptides, CO_{2}, alcohol and organic acids.

Although only one type of starter is required, many Chinese breweries use two or more types of starters for added flavor complexity. Modern Chinese brewing adopted many practices to optimize production and a 'seed mash' is now commonly prepared where the qū is added, often along with the yeast (酵母; jiàomǔ or simply 酵; jiào), to a small amount of the substrate. After incubation for 2–7 days, the seed mash is then added.

== Microbiota ==
The environment exerts a significant influence on Xiu microbiology. Relevant microbe species and genera prefer different climatic conditions, and domestication in the qū making process favored the development of regional microbiota assemblages across China. By comparison, the industrial Japanese koji-making process favors a single monoculture species, Aspergillus oryzae. One difficulty in identifying the species present in qū appears to be bias introduced by the analytical technique. Culture-dependent or DNA extraction methods often miss entire species or misrepresent their statistical importance. Studies have failed to establish any pattern in qū microbiology across China, reflecting regional diversity.

=== Molds ===
Molds are the most prevalent organisms found in qū and are considered to be the dominant enzymatic agents responsible for liberating glucose and other fermentable sugars from the source of carbohydrates used (along with the yeast Saccharomycopsis fibuligera). Molds found in traditional Chinese fermentation starters include Aspergillus, Rhizopus, Amylomyces, Monascus, Absidia, Rhizomucor, and Mucor. Species of Rhizopus are capable of producing fumaric acid, lactic acid and ethanol as they excrete zymases, but their production capabilities vary widely from strain to strain. Rhizopus oryzae and Aspergillus oryzae are the two most common molds isolated in qu.

The mold species appears to be an important factor in determining the resulting type of qū. In turn, the dominant mold species is dependent on the climate, the substrate, and the production techniques. Both substrate and incubation phases can be adjusted to favor the growth of desired species, e.g. Rhizopus and Mucor prefer higher water activities and temperatures to Aspergillus, whilst Mucor and Actinomucor prefer substrates richer in protein. In some reported examples of qū microbiology, potentially harmful strains of mold were encountered such as Aspergillus flavus and Rhizopus microsporus, but it is uncertain if they were identified correctly or if those specific strains were capable of toxin production.

=== Yeast ===
Yeast species form part of the symbiotic nature of a qū starter and can be enzymatic (substrate-degrading) and/or fermentative. Yeast genera observed for qū in decreasing order of significance include Saccharomycopsis, Issatchenkia, Saccharomyces, Pichia, Candida and Rhodotorula. The yeast species most frequently reported for qū starters is Saccharomycopsis fibuligera, as is typical for traditional East Asian fermentation starters. A close relative, Issatchenkia orientalis, is also reported frequently, and together they appear to be co-involved in starch breakdown with the mold genera. Both species have limited but capable (3–5% alcohol) fermentative capacities. Pichia anomala is almost ubiquitous and although incapable of elevated alcohol production, it appears to be vital in developing taste and aroma. Saccharomyces cerevisiae is the most common highly fermentative yeast present in Xiu.

=== Bacteria ===
Bacterial species are present in large numbers in qū and are partly responsible for the breakdown of proteins and carbohydrates and the conversion of fermentable sugars into organic acids. Lactic acid is the most common organic acid found in Chinese alcoholic beverages and plays a vital role in both the organoleptic qualities, as well as acting as a naturally occurring preservative. The bacterial species most commonly found (in decreasing significance) include Bacillus, Lactobacillus, Leuconostoc, Streptomyces, Acetobacter and Clostridium. Bacillus species are the dominant bacterial genera in Xiu. Bacillus species are known to be large producers of enzymes and therefore contribute to the overall breakdown of the cereal grains.

== Types ==
An exponential variety of qū can be produced by manipulating the ingredients and processes across the different environments. Some types are produced by exploiting natural temperature shifts, others by mechanical temperature adjustments. Some qū are wrapped in straw and sun-dried, while others are wrapped in straw and hung from the rafters to dry. Although qū contains its own distinctive, region-specific mix of microorganisms, the temperature schemes involved in preparation manipulates the microbial ecology, e.g., Aspergillus oryzae and species of Actinomucor and Mucor prefer lower temperatures than Rhizopus oryzae. In turn, the starch ingredients used also alter the microbial ecology dictating both the type and the number of metabolites present, e.g., Aspergillus oryzae and Rhizopus oryzae both produce more starch degrading enzymes and are found commonly on 100% flour substrates, whilst Actinomucor and Mucor produce more proteolytic and lipolytic enzymes and are more abundant when pulse flours are added.

Each type of qū can be used individually or in conjunction with others. Huangjiu, or cereal wines, can incorporate one or several of the starters with the combination of xiao and daqu being the most common. In contrast, baijiu, a distilled beverage, generally uses only daqu.

=== Xiaoqu ===
Xiaoqu or "small starter" (小曲; 小麴; xiǎoqū) are generally small (10–100 grams or 0.35–3.53 ounces) cubes or flattened or rounded balls made of rice dough incubated for usually only several days. Rice flour or bran and inoculum are used, with bentonite clay as a bulking agent. Traditionally various herbs (from one to fifteen varieties) are incorporated into the preparation as either you (herb xiao) or bark (white or herbless xiao). They are commonly referred to as Chinese or Shanghai yeast balls when available through Western Chinese suppliers.

Used mostly for the production of huangjiu and jiuniang and most popular in the southern provinces, xiao is added only to inoculate a fermentation and constitutes very little of the substrate in producing cereal wines (typically 3–8%). As such, xiao contributes very minor flavor, aroma, or enzymatic function when compared to daqu. Xiaoqu is the Chinese equivalent of what most other East, South, and Southeast Asian countries use as a fermentation starter, e.g. banh men, bubo, Murcia, ragi, nuruk.

Incubation is relatively simple and done at ambient temperatures of 25–35 °C (77–95 °F) for four to five days, before drying. Xiaoqu is almost always white because Rhizopus oryzae is the dominant mold species and saccharifying agent. Some types of xiao are now prepared by mixing yeast sediment with the normal inoculum to produce a more fermentative starter.

=== Daqu ===
Daqu or "large starter" (大曲; 大麴; dàqū) are large (1–5 kg or 2.2–11.0 lb) cakes or bricks of dough that have been incubated for long periods, typically 3–4 or 6–8 weeks, and then matured for an extended period of six months or more. They are rarely available outside of China. Wheat flour is the main ingredient, but some specific types call for the use of barley-wheat and barley-pea flour. The four most famous baijiu, Maotai, Fenjiu, Luzhou Laojiao, and Xifengjiu, are all made with daqu only. Some huangjiu are often started with xiao and finished with daqu. Daqu can come in three colors that mostly reflect the dominant mold species present: grey-white (Rhizopus oryzae and/or R. chinensis), yellow to yellow-green (Aspergillus oryzae), and black (A. niger and/or A. luchuensis).

Both the larger size and the longer incubation ensure higher enzyme and microbial load than xiao. They are the only starter used for most baijiu fermentations due to their greater starch degrading capacity, i.e., they contribute a high number of enzymes. The greater degree of microbial metabolism because of a longer, higher temperature conversion phase of incubation is also said to provide certain organoleptic qualities that would be otherwise unachievable in the final product. This directly relates to the greater use of data as an ingredient in making baijiu rather than simply as an inoculant. Daqu typically constitutes 15–25% of the overall fermentable, whereas xiao is used only to inoculate a fermentation (3–8%). The heavy use (50%) of large 5 kg (11 lb) bricks of daqu incubated at high temperatures is responsible for the pungent aroma and umami-like the flavor of Maotai.

Daqu is the most complex process of qū preparation and has undergone the most modernization. It involves the manipulation of specific time-temperature control schemes to achieve slightly different types, which in turn are used to generate several types of liquor. The four baijiu aromas most typical are considered to be sauce-aroma (e.g., Maotai), strong-aroma (e.g., Luzhou Laojiao), mixed-aroma (e.g., Xifengjiu) and light-aroma (e.g., Fenjiu). Daqu preparation is manipulated to help produce these different aromas.

Daqu can be generally categorized into three kinds according to the highest temperature achieved during incubation: high-temperature (60–70 °C or 140–158 °F), medium-temperature (50–60 °C or 122–140 °F) and low-temperature (40–50 °C or 104–122 °F), respectively. As an example of the differing usage schemes, Maotai uses high-temp daqu and Luzhou Laojiao uses medium-temp daqu, and both are made from wheat flour. Fenjiu and Xifengjiu use low-temp daqu made from barley and pea flour but differ in the coarseness of the crushed grains.

High- and medium-temperature daqu generally undergo a four-step process:

1. a low-temperature (30–40 °C or 86–104 °F) incubation phase for 3–5 days to stimulate the initial growth of microbes,
2. a higher temperature (50–70 °C or 122–158 °F) conversion phase for 3–5 days to increase the metabolic activities of the microbes,
3. a curing phase (45 °C or 113 °F) for 9–12 days to create flavors and dehydrate the cake and
4. maturation for up to six months or more at ambient temperatures.

Low-temperature daqu typically undergo a six-step process:

1. a low temperature (35–40 °C or 95–104 °F) incubation phase for 2–4 days
2. a cooling phase (25–35 °C or 77–95 °F) For 3–5 days to stabilize the growth of microbes.
3. a heating phase (40–50 °C or 104–122 °F) For 4–5 days to increase metabolic activities.
4. a curing phase (45 °C or 113 °F) for 7–8 days to create flavor and further dehydrate the cake.
5. an equilibration phase (<35 °C or 95 °F) for 4–5 days to cool the cakes.
6. maturation for up to six months or more at ambient temperatures.

The scientific basis for these processes need to be clarified, as standardizing production methods is a goal of the Chinese alcohol industry.

=== Hongqu ===
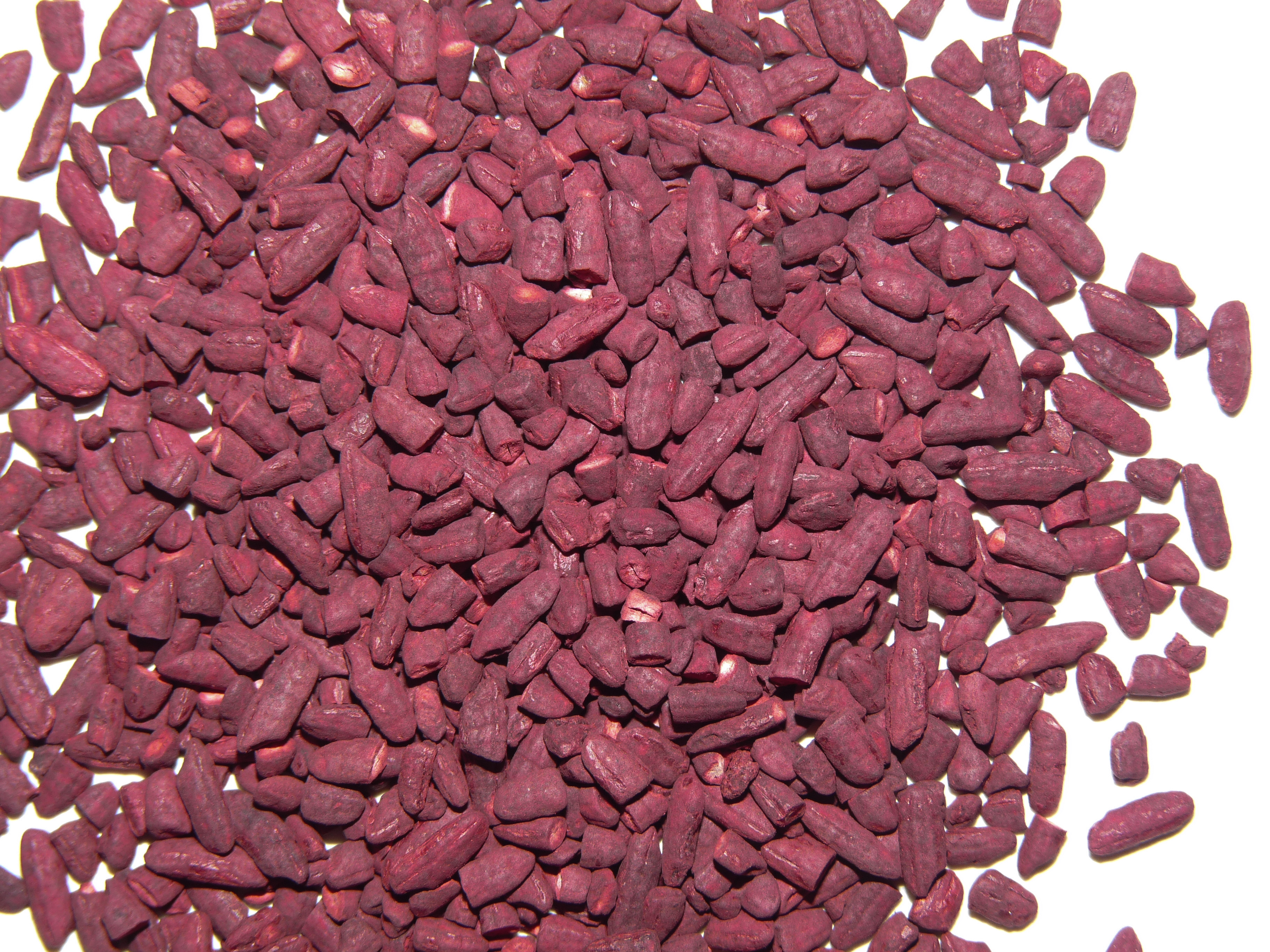
Red yeast rice (hongqu), a dried culture of Monascus purpureus

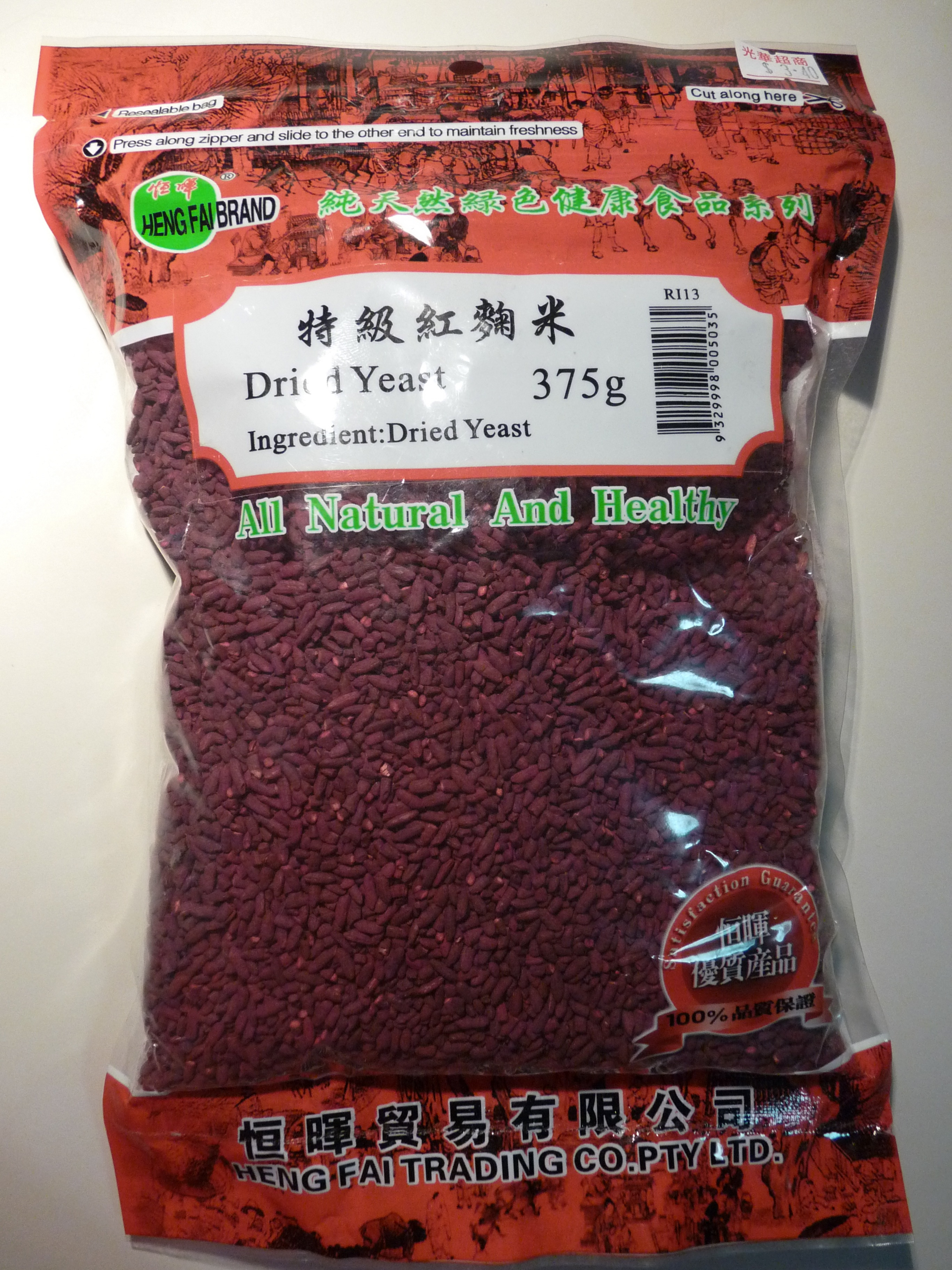
A bag of red yeast rice (hongqu)

Hongqu or "red starter" (红曲; 紅麴; hóngqū), also called bangkok in Hokkien, is rice cultured primarily with Monascus purpureus or other red rice molds of the genus Monascus, available as dried, mold-encrusted rice with a unique red color, and sold as "red yeast rice". Used mostly for huangjiu and rice vinegar, this starter gives the beverage a unique red or purple color due to pigments produced by members of Monascus. Gutian hongqu is the name for this starter, inoculated with a "seed" culture called qumu, containing only Monascus species. A popular alternative variety also used is Wuyi hongqu, which involves seeding the rice with both Qū Mu as above and Qū Qing, a "seed" culture that contains a black mold (A. niger or A. luchuensis) to make the rice black on the outside and red inside. A rarer variety is called Huangyi Hong qū which involves Monascus with a yellow mold (A. oryzae or A. flavus) to make the rice yellow on the outside and red on the inside.

Hongqu is prepared in a way similar to Japanese koji: rice is steamed, cooled, and then mixed with the inoculum (1–2%). It is then transferred to an incubation room where the temperature is maintained at 35–40 °C (95–104 °F) for four to five days and the rice is stirred frequently. Modern practice is to steep the rice in weak acetic acid solution for a short period to help create the optimum pH of 3–3.5 that favors Monascus growth. Afterward, the rice is removed and dried.

Often in the production of hongqu rice wine, both hong and xiao are utilized. Studies have revealed that Monascus species show strong gluco-amylase activity, but poor proteolytic and lipolytic enzyme production. Also, the fermentative yeast Saccharomyces cerevisiae was mostly absent from hong starters but present in xiao. Thus, hong is used only to provide red pigmentation and saccharification and as such, should generally be used in conjunction with another starter with high fermentative capability.

=== Minor varieties ===
The following form the fourth category of qū: màiqū is a starter for wheat only. It is used as a major component (15–25%) of the total starter for some huangjiu. The manufacturing process and microbiota are similar to daqu, but is made entirely from wheat.

- Shenqu (from Shenzhen; 神曲) uses raw, roasted, and steamed wheat,
- Fuqu (麸曲) uses wheat bran,
- Shumaiqu (熟麦曲) uses only steamed wheat,
- Benqu (笨曲) uses only roasted wheat,
- Sengmaiqu (生麦曲) uses only raw wheat

== See also ==
- Agkud
- Awamori
- Chinese wine
