= Wuliangye (spirit) =

Chinese liquor

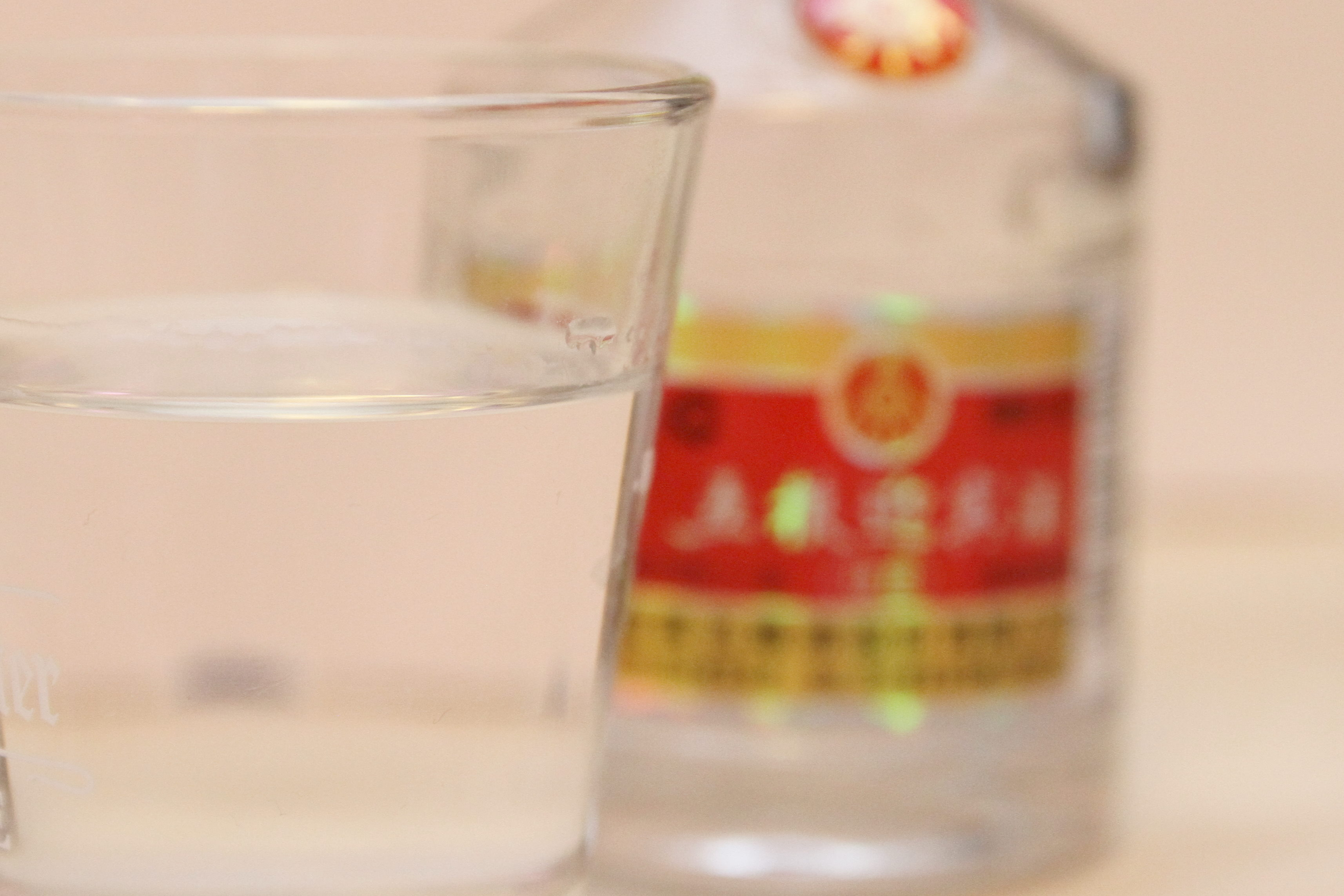
Wuliangye, a Chinese baijiu liquor.

Wuliangye (Chinese: 五粮液; pinyin: wǔ liáng yè; lit. 'Five Grains Liquid') is a Chinese baijiu liquor made from proso millet, maize, glutinous rice, long-grain rice and wheat. Although the formula was developed during the Ming dynasty (1368–1644), the name Wuliangye was given to it in 1905. Since 1959, the formula has been nationalized and standardized. Wuliangye Yibin is the drink's propriety maker and one of the largest baijiu manufacturers in China. The highest grade of Wuliangye retails for CN¥26,800 (US$3,375).

During the 2019 sales promotion event Singles' Day, Wuliangye sold baijiu products for a reported CN¥100,000,000 on online shopping platform Tmall.
