= Byejoe =

Brand of baijiu

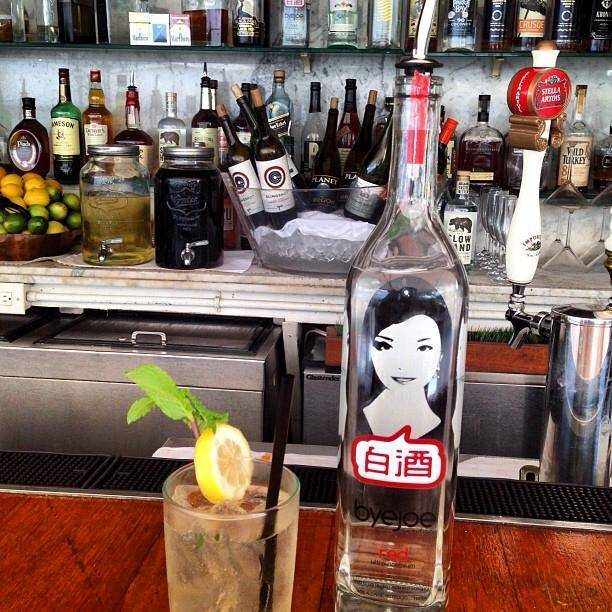
Byejoe red mixology

byejoe is a baijiu (Chinese: 白酒; pinyin: báijiǔ) brand produced and marketed by byejoe USA, headquartered in Houston, Texas. Baijiu is the national spirit of China. It literally means "white spirit" or "white wine", and is the most consumed spirit in the world by volume. byejoe is the first widely marketed baijiu in the United States specifically targeting the western consumer.

== About Baijiu ==
Baijiu signifies a wide variety of all Chinese spirits. It is typically distilled from sorghum or wheat, but can also be made from corn, barley, oak, or peas. Baijius can range from 30% ABV to 60% ABV, and are typically classified by aroma category: light, strong, sauce, or rice aroma.

Baijiu has been an integral part of Chinese drinking culture for thousands of years and is always served with meals, included in celebrations, and consumed when conducting business negotiations. According to data from the International Wine & Spirit Research Group, baijiu is by far the world's largest spirit category, with 11 billion liters of baijiu consumed in 2012, accounting for one-third of the alcohol consumed in the world.

== About byejoe ==
byejoe is a light aroma baijiu distilled from 100% red sorghum. byejoe is distilled in China, then imported into the United States in small batches. After it is imported into the United States, it goes through a natural filtration process and is then bottled for consumption.

byejoe is certified Kosher

=== Flavors ===
byejoe is available in 2 flavors. The unflavored, byejoe red, is the original baijiu and is 40% ABV. The second variation is known as byejoe dragon fire and is 35% ABV. dragon fire is the original baijiu infused with dragon fruit, lychee, and hot chilis.

Both flavors are available nationwide through the company's e-commerce site. byejoe is also available in bars, restaurants, and liquor stores in the following states: California, Florida, Texas, and New York.

=== Awards and Tasting Notes ===
byejoe has earned 13 gold medals in both tasting and packaging design categories for its flavors byejoe red and byejoe dragon fire. This includes 1 Triple Gold, 2 Double Golds, and 10 Gold Medals.

==== 2013 Awards for byejoe red ====
- Double Gold: Packaging and Design, San Francisco World Spirits Competition
- 91 "Excellent Highly Recommended": Tasting, Ultimate Spirits Challenge
- Gold: Tasting, Beverage Tasting Institute

==== 2014 Awards for byejoe red ====
- Triple Gold: Tasting, MicroLiquor Spirit Awards
- Gold: Packaging and Design, MicroLiquor Spirit Awards
- Gold: Tasting, Denver International Spirits Competition
- Gold: Tasting, Beverly Hills International Awards Competition
- Gold: Tasting, Craft Spirit Awards

==== 2014 Awards for byejoe dragon fire ====
- Double Gold: Tasting, Wine and Spirits Wholesalers of America
- Gold: Tasting, Denver International Spirits Competition
- Gold: Tasting, Beverly Hills International Spirits Competition
- Gold: Tasting, MicroLiquor Spirit Awards
- Gold: Packaging and Design, MicroLiquor Spirit Awards
