= Xifeng =

Xifeng may refer to:

- Xifeng County, Guizhou (息烽县)
- Xifeng County, Liaoning (西丰县)
- Xifeng District (西峰区), Qingyang, Gansu
- Xifeng jiu (西凤酒), Chinese alcoholic beverage
- Xifeng, Liaoning (西丰镇), town in and seat of Xifeng County
- Xifeng, Heilongjiang (西丰镇), in Raohe County

== See also ==
- Xie Feng (disambiguation)
