= Xifengjiu =

Chinese Baijiu Distillery

Xifengjiu 西凤酒
- Company type: State-Owned Enterprise
- Industry: Alcoholic Beverages
- Founded: 1956
- Headquarters: Liulin, Fengxiang, Baoji, Shaanxi, China
- Area served: Worldwide
- Key people: Zhang Zheng (Chairman)
- Products: Baijiu
- Number of employees: 6,000+ (2023)
- Website: sxxfj.com

Xifengjiu
- Simplified Chinese: 西凤酒
- Traditional Chinese: 西鳳酒
- Literal meaning: West Phoenix Liquor
Transcriptions
Standard Mandarin
- Hanyu Pinyin: xī fèng jiǔ
- Wade–Giles: hsi^{1} feng^{4} chiu^{3}

Shaanxi Xifengjiu Co. Ltd. (Chinese: 陕西西凤酒股份有限公司), or simply Xifengjiu (Chinese: 西凤酒; lit. 'West Phoenix Liquor'), is a distillery headquartered in Fengxiang, Shaanxi, China that is the exclusive producer of Xifengjiu, the sole representative of the fengxiang style of baijiu. Xifengjiu has long stood as one of the more famous representatives of distilled spirits in China, having been recognized as one of the "Four Famous Spirits" in the 1952 National Alcohol Appraisal Conference.

Today, Xifengjiu's national reputation is a little more subdued although it retains a high level of popularity in Shaanxi itself where 70% of its 50,000 tonne annual output is now sold.

== Product Characteristics ==
Xifengjiu as a spirit is distinguished in its production process, aging techniques, and the resulting aroma which combine the techniques of both northern and southern Chinese spirits into a product unique to its own.

To start, sorghum is used as the base for fermentation. The grain is ground and steamed in order to release some of the starch. After being cooled, it is mixed with daqu, a barley and pea based qū, which will serve as the fermentation starter. Much like xifengjiu's nongxiang cousins (Luzhou Laojiao, Wuliangye, etc.), the grain is fermented in mud pits however, fermentation times are much shorter at only 10 days and the mud is scraped clean and a fresh coat applied annually. After the grain has been fermented and distilled to produce and extract ethanol, the resulting spirit is aged in "jiu hai" (Chinese: 酒海; lit. 'sea of spirit'), rattan baskets lined with hardened hemp paper and cotton cloth, before being blended, proofed, bottled, and sold.

This unique process combining techniques from various parts of China produces a spirit with significant levels of ethyl acetate and ethyl hexanoate, which have been described as having tart apple and cherry notes on the nose and earthen honey notes on the pallet.

== History ==
The roots of Xifengjiu lie 4,000 years ago near the end of the Shang dynasty in a drink known then as "qinjiu" (qin wine). In the Rites of Zhou it was written that during the Zhou dynasty this drink, already readily known by the then ruler King Wen of Zhou, and its production methods were studied by a royal official who produced a set of technical guidelines in the brewing of alcohol called "Five Qi, Six Methods" (五齐六法), one of the earliest records of wine making techniques in the world. Over the centuries the wine became more associated with its source and by the time Pei Xingjian passed through Liulin as he guided the persian king-in-exile Narsieh back to Persia, the drink was known as "liulinjiu" after the town in which it was produced. In 757, during the Tang dynasty, it was renamed "fengxiang" (凤翔; phoenix flight) after legends of phoenix's taking flight from the region. In the Song dynasty the poet Su Shi, while serving as a magistrate in Fengxiang wrote; "When the flowers are in bloom and the wine is sweet, one can drink without drunkenness."

By the beginning of the 17th century, during the Ming dynasty, distilled spirit with the name "xifengjiu" was being produced by nearly 50 distilleries in Fengxiang.

In 1956, after the Chinese Civil War, the distilleries in the region were nationalized and combined into the Shaanxi Xifengjiu Co. Ltd.
