= Laojiao =

Laojiao may refer to:

- Re-education through labor (劳教)
- Khufiyya or Old Teaching (老教)
- Luzhou Laojiao, a Chinese liquor
