= Agkud =

Native Filipino alcoholic drink

- Type: Rice wine, fermented rice
- Origin: The Philippines, Bukidnon
- Ingredients: Rice

Agkud is a traditional Filipino fermented rice paste or rice wine of the Manobo people from Bukidnon. Agkud specifically refers to fermented three-day-old paste made with rice, ginger, sugarcane juice, and agonan or tapey (the yeast starter culture, also known as bubud or tapay in Tagalog and Visayan languages). The rice wine pangasi is made from agkud except fermented longer for at least one month. Modern versions of the agkud can use other sources of starch like cassava, sorghum, or corn. Hot peppers may also be used instead of ginger. Agkud is drunk during celebrations, rituals, and various social events.

== See also ==
- Bahalina
- Basi
- Kaong palm vinegar
- Nipa palm vinegar
- Pangasi
- Tapuy
