= Xie Feng =

Xie Feng may refer to:

- Xie Feng (footballer) (Chinese: 谢峰; pinyin: Xiè Fēng) (born 1966), Chinese retired footballer
- Xie Feng (politician) (Chinese: 解峰; pinyin: Xiè Fēng) (1922-2004), Chinese politician, Governor of Hebei 1986-88
- Xie Feng (diplomat) (谢锋, born 1964), Chinese diplomat

== See also ==
- Xifeng (disambiguation)
