= Baijiu =

Distilled alcoholic beverage from China

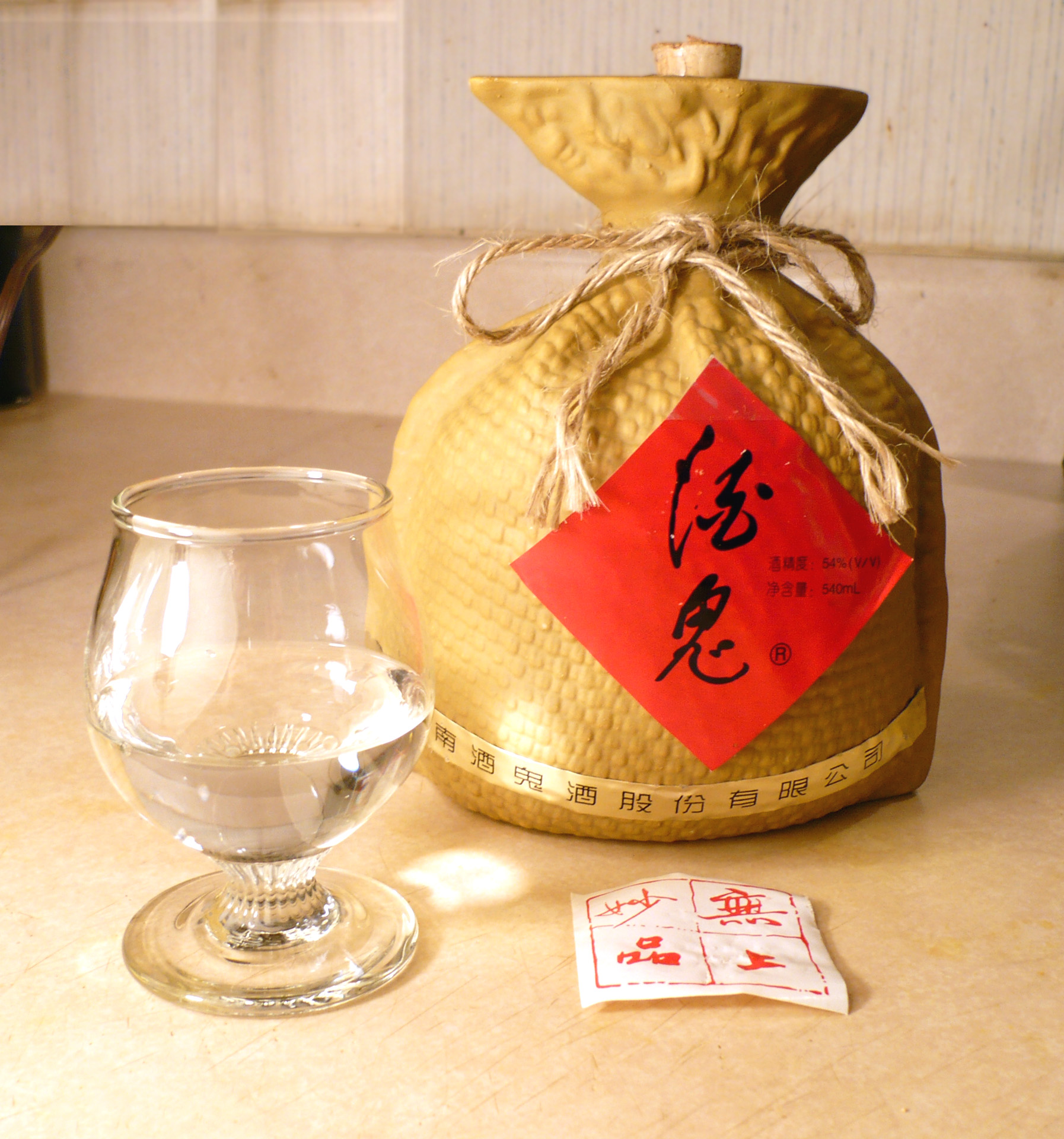
- A glass and bottle of “Jiugui” (酒鬼) brand baijiu
- Type: Distilled beverage
- Origin: China, East Asia
- Alcohol by volume: 35–60%
- Proof (US): 70–120
- Color: Clear
- Variants: light aroma, strong aroma, sauce aroma, rice aroma, phoenix aroma, mixed aroma, chi aroma, sesame aroma, medicine aroma, extra-strong aroma, special aroma, laobaigan, small qu baijiu
- Related products: shōchū, soju, huangjiu, mijiu, sake

Chinese name
- Chinese: 白酒
- Literal meaning: "white (clear) liquor"
Transcriptions
Standard Mandarin
- Hanyu Pinyin: báijiǔ
- Wade–Giles: pai^{2}-chiu^{3}
- IPA: [pǎɪ.tɕjòʊ]
Wu
- Romanization: baq cieu
Yue: Cantonese
- Yale Romanization: baahk-jáu
- Jyutping: Baak^{6} Zau^{2}
- IPA: [pak̚˨.tsɐw˧˥]

Alternative Chinese name
- Simplified Chinese: 烧酒
- Traditional Chinese: 燒酒
- Literal meaning: burning liquor
Transcriptions
Standard Mandarin
- Hanyu Pinyin: shāojiǔ
Wu
- Romanization: sau-cieu
Yue: Cantonese
- Jyutping: Siu1 Zau2
Southern Min
- Tâi-lô: sio-tsiú

Baijiu (Chinese: 白酒; pinyin: báijiǔ; lit. 'white (clear) liquor'), or shaojiu (simplified Chinese: 烧酒; traditional Chinese: 燒酒; pinyin: shāojiǔ; lit. 'burning liquor'), is a colorless Chinese liquor typically coming in between 35% and 60% alcohol by volume (ABV). Each type of baijiu uses its own type of starter (qū) for fermentation to create a distinct and characteristic flavor profile.

Baijiu is usually distilled from fermented sorghum, although other grains may be used; some southeastern Chinese varieties may employ rice and glutinous rice while others may use wheat, barley, millet, or Job's tears (Chinese: 薏苡; pinyin: yìyǐ) in their mash bills. The qū used in the production of baijiu is usually made from pulverized wheat grain or steamed rice.

Because of its clarity, baijiu can appear similar to several other East Asian liquors, e.g. Japanese shōchū (25%) or Korean soju (20–45%), but it often has a significantly higher ethanol content (35–60%).

== History ==
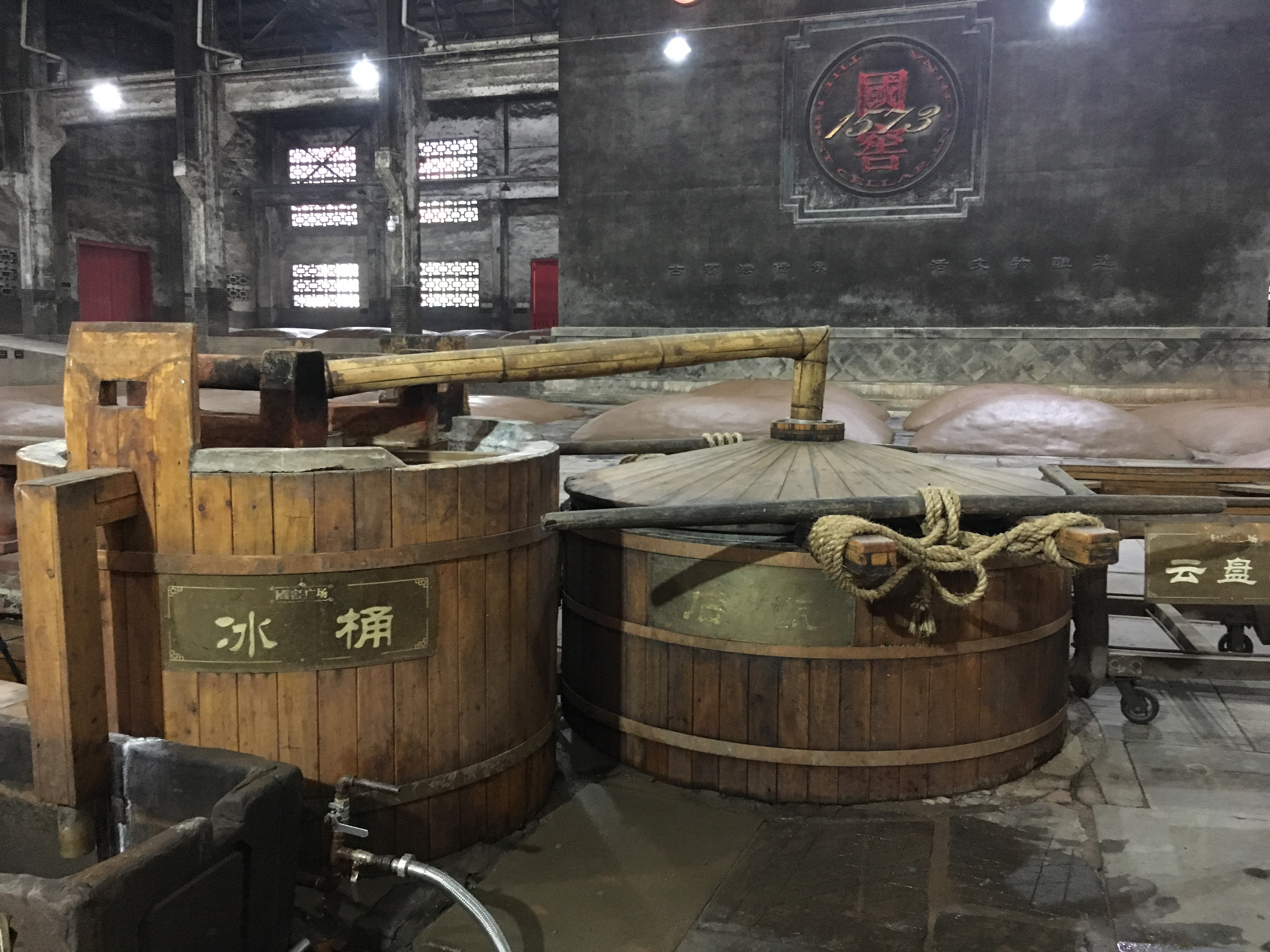
A Guojiao distillery, featuring apparatus for traditional baijiu distillation.

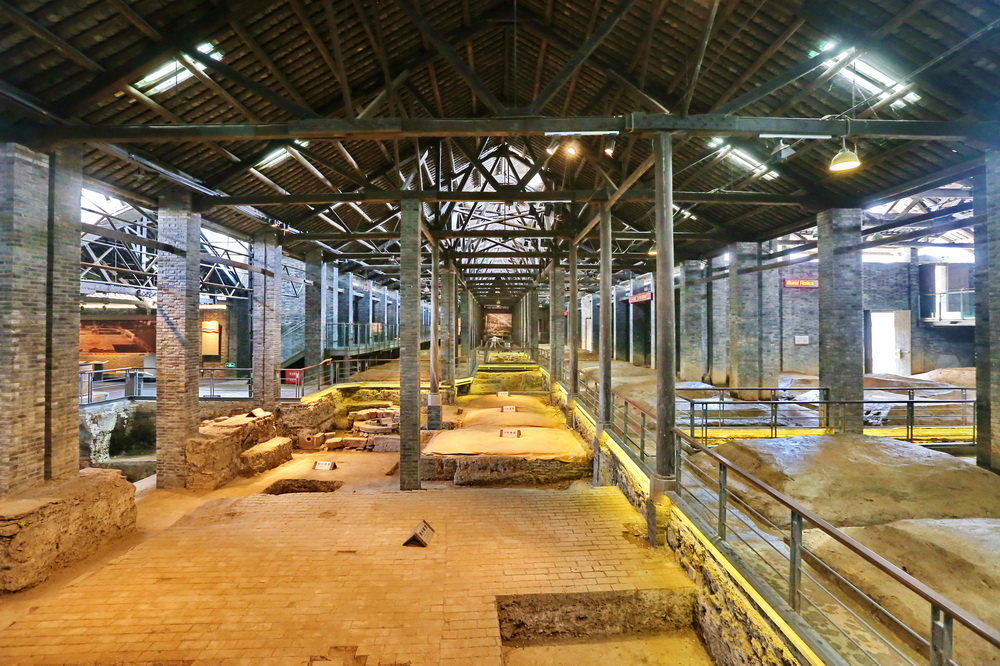
Shuijing Fang (水井坊) distillery remains in Chengdu, Sichuan. Each baijiu distillery has its own qu which contains a specific microbiome that would develop their branded flavor profile. The troughs in which qu is cultured are traditionally an inseparable part of the distillery.

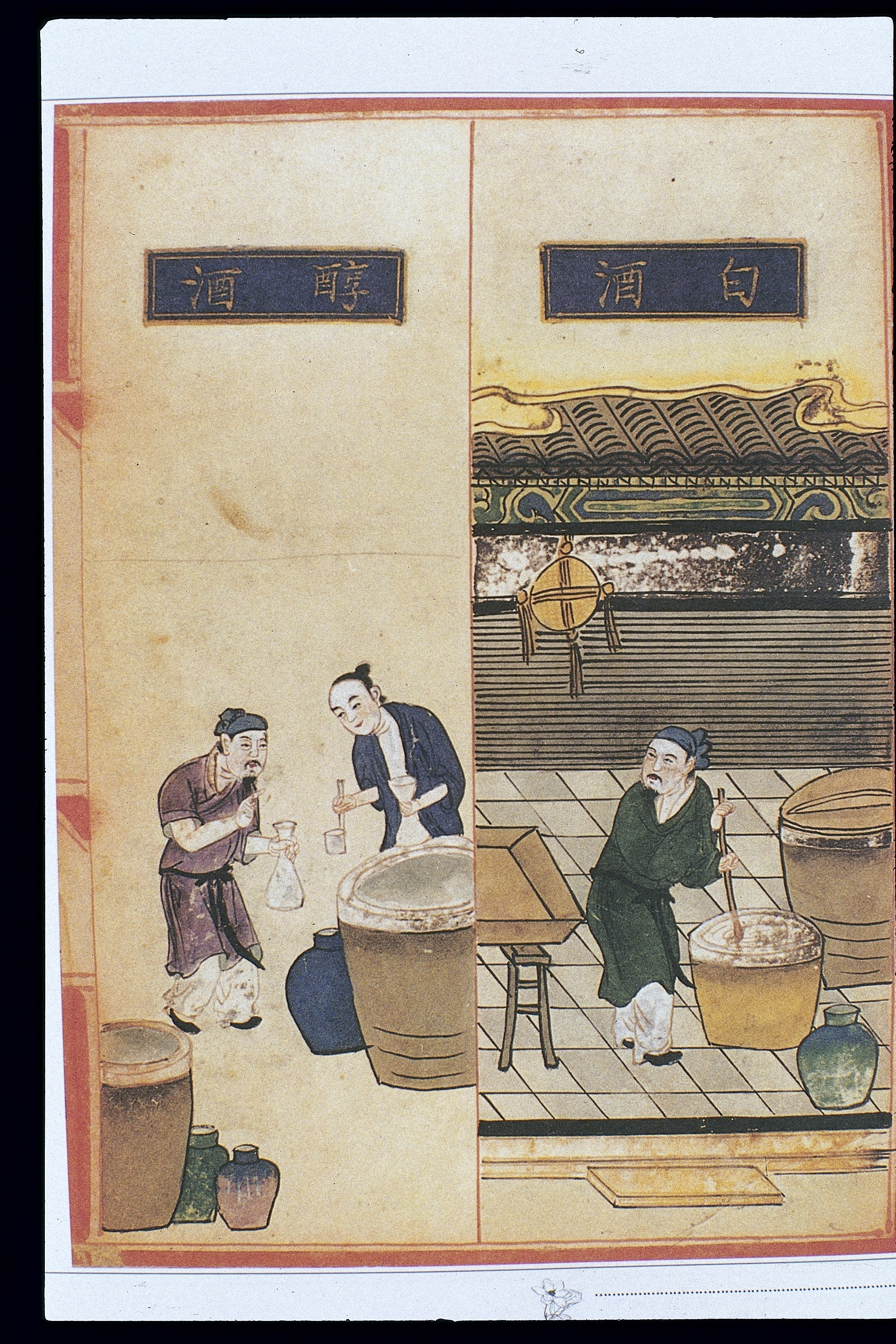
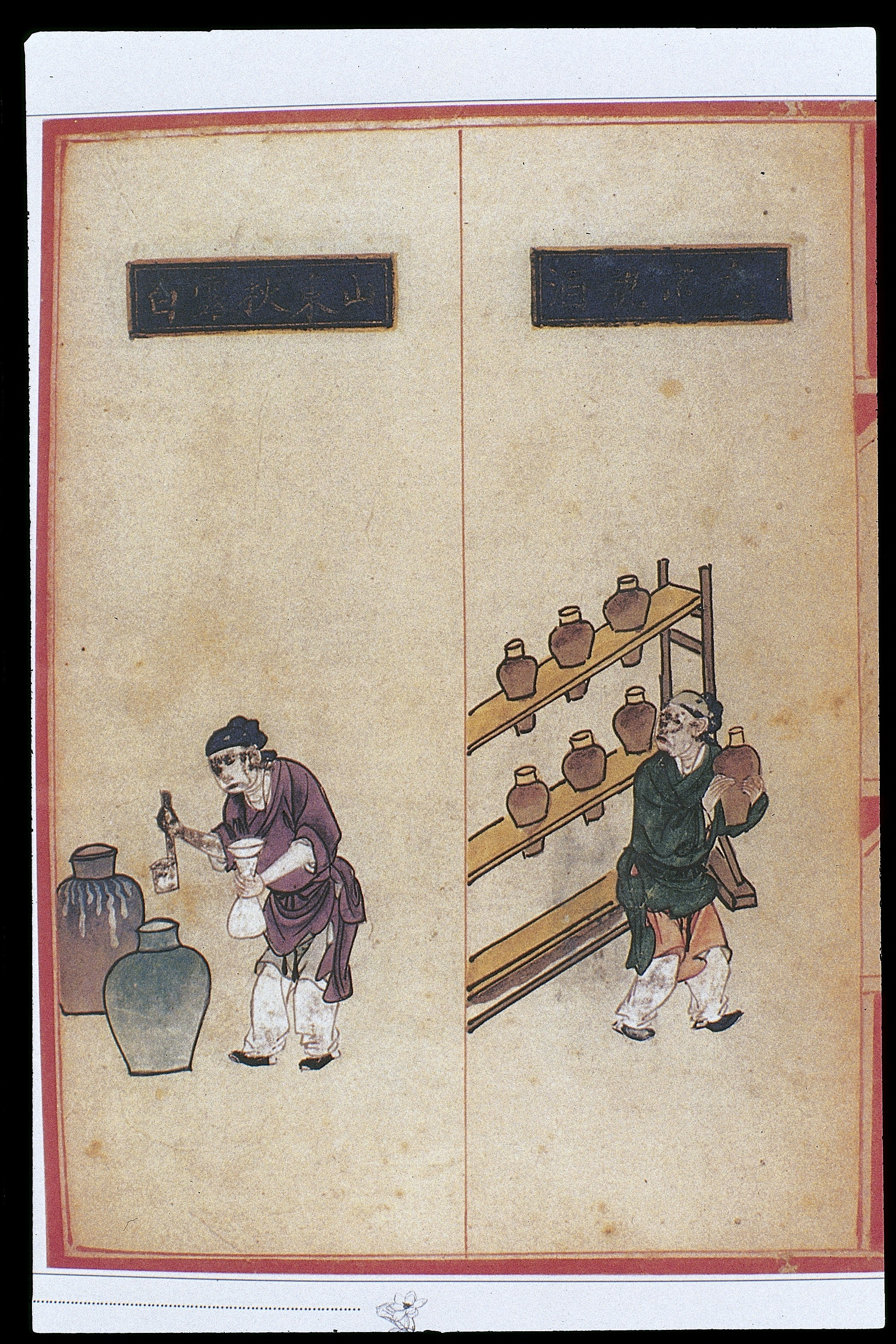
Ming dynasty (1368–1644) illustration of the baijiu distilling process.

No exact dates are known for the invention of the modern form of baijiu as it emerged gradually with the historical development of distillery technology.

- Prototypical alcohol making in China dates back to as early as the Neolithic Age with archaeological discoveries of alcoholic beverage containers belonging to that period.
- A systematic distillery process was likely developed during the Han dynasty (202 BC – 220 AD) with archeological finds of brick arts depicting distilling scenes.
- The first proto-baijiu was likely made during the Tang dynasty (618–907) as the drink was described by poets Bai Juyi (白居易) and Yong Tao (雍陶) at the time.
- The flourishing of Song dynasty (960–1279) commerce and urbanization likely popularized alcohol consumption with a boom of Jiuguan (酒馆, 'pub, bar') in major cities.
- By this time the proto-baijiu was likely to be only about 15% ABV as literature from the time recorded "bowls of alcohol consumed" suggesting that it must have been weaker than the modern form baijiu.
- During the Yuan dynasty (1271–1368), Middle Eastern distillery technology spread to China, which probably improved the existing distillery techniques, allowing for higher-degree distilled alcohol to be possible.
- The distillation technology matured as baijiu began to resemble its modern form around the Ming dynasty (1368–1644). Detailed description of Baijiu was recorded in Bencao Gangmu (本草纲目, Compendium of Materia Medica) by Li Shizhen.
- Baijiu continued to evolve with the refinements of baijiu making techniques over the centuries until today.

Baijiu is characterized by solid-state fermentation and distillation using a grain culture called qū, which allows for simultaneous saccharification and fermentation. This is a typical feature of liquors produced in East Asia. Chinese baijiu is always distilled from grain, produced in batches and blended.

== Serving ==
=== Traditional etiquette ===
The Chinese traditionally serve baijiu neat at room temperature, in small cups or glasses, though drinkware varies by region. It is traditional to drink baijiu with food rather than on its own, though it is often infused with fruit or medicinal herbs and spices.

The ceremonial includes the following steps:

1. Execute the Baili (拜礼) greeting to show respect to the host.
2. Spill a moderate amount of baijiu in the cup onto the ground to show gratitude to nature.
3. Take a sip and taste the baijiu, and tell the host your opinion.
4. Finish the baijiu in the small glass in one go after the Ganbei (干杯, 'Cheers') and clinking of glasses.

Note that the host should initiate and invite for a cup, and the guest should reply with a cup.

=== Modern etiquette ===
In modern days, ceremonial parts of the etiquettes are ignored. Commonly with a group of friends or family, the host would initiate with "Cheers for...!" (为...干杯!), and then guests would finish their cups after clinking the glasses. Tasting is also appreciated.

In 2007, a report in Time magazine mentioned integrating baijiu into cocktails, and in the years since several bars around the world have added baijiu to their cocktail programs.

=== Baijiu and Chinese business culture ===
Chinese business culture is known to be intense. It is assumed that one's true self is shown when intoxicated. Therefore, when negotiating a business partnership, there is a tradition of serving high-degree Baijiu on the dinner table, in order to judge one's trustworthiness. There are also folk values, especially in rural China, that consuming alcohol excessively equates to manliness and that one should not reject a serving offered by an elderly or higher-up. Many inexperienced Chinese drinkers are persuaded to overdrink on such occasions. These experiences are commonly referred to as the reason for Baijiu's unpopularity among some. This negative association of Baijiu with extreme drinking culture can sometimes lead to fear of Baijiu in the younger generation or people who have yet to try the drink.

== Pricing and the baijiu market ==
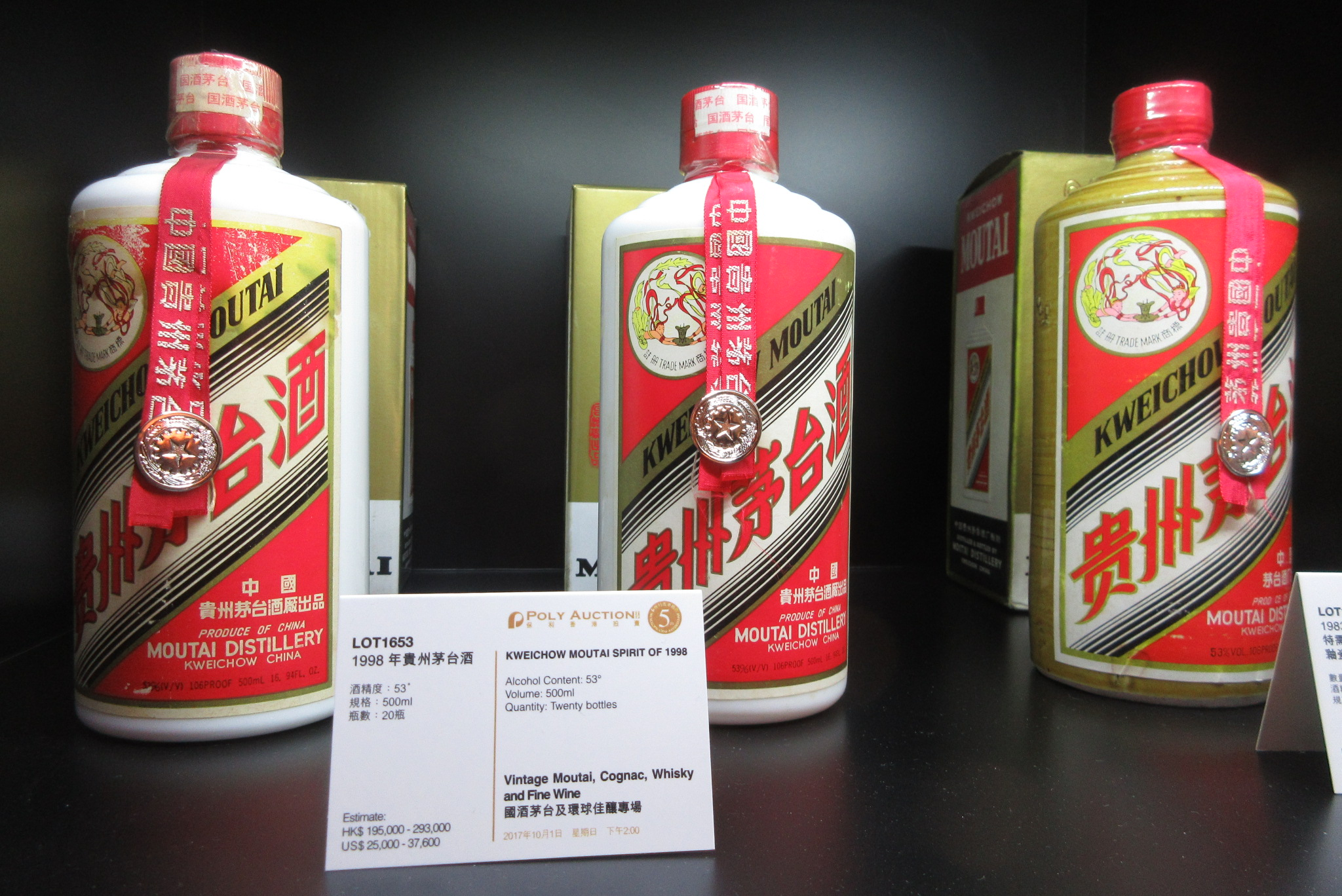
A set of 20 bottles of Maotai (Moutai) produced in 1998 has an estimated price range of HK$195,000–293,000 (US$25,000–37,600) in an auction in Hong Kong in 2017.

Although most baijiu are priced similarly to other liquors with similar alcohol percentage, some high-end baijiu can be highly collectible due to the intricate skills and traditional artisanship involved in the making of baijiu, the age of the baijiu, or the rarity of the bottle etc. With the gifting tradition in some areas of China, sometimes expensive baijiu could also be gifted instead of being consumed. There is a sizable market for high-end baijiu collection for the above reasons. For example, the highest grade of Wuliangye retails for CN¥26,800 (US$3,375). Top-tier baijiu are likely to be from traditional baijiu distillery such as Kweichow Maotai, Wuliangye, Luzhou Laojiao, Shuijing Fang etc.

On the opposite side of the spectrum. Low-end baijiu can be as inexpensive as a can of beer per volume. For example, Erguotou and Jiang Xiaobai. Although some deride the low ends for their taste, they are more casually consumed with meals, or just when drinkers want to simply get drunk.

=== Global baijiu market ===
Baijiu is the world's bestselling liquor, with 5,000,000,000 liters (1.1×10^{9} imp gal; 1.3×10^{9} U.S. gal) sold as of 2016, and 10.8 billion liters sold in 2018, more than whisky, vodka, gin, rum and tequila combined. As well as the most consumed liquor, with 1.2 billion nine-liter cases consumed in 2018, mostly in China – three times the global consumption of vodka. Outside of China it is gaining popularity, as seen with the sale of Ming River Baijiu in US and EU markets from late 2010s, a strong-aroma (nongxiang) type baijiu sourced from the Luzhou Laojiao distillery.

=== International production ===
In 2013 and 2014 an American company, Byejoe, based out of Houston, Texas won a number of awards for their Baijiu product. Byejoe used imported baijiu and distilled it in South Carolina.

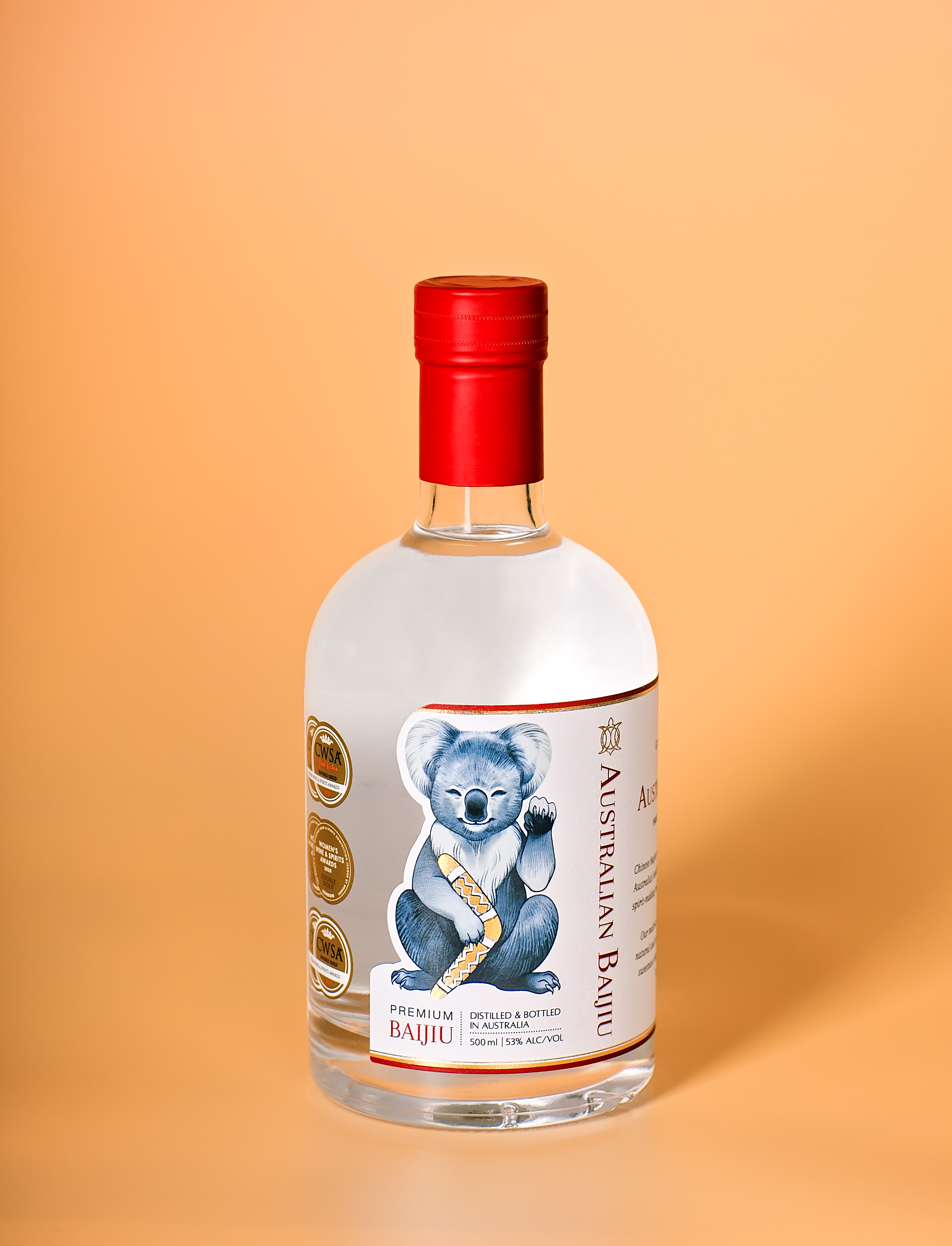
Baijiu made in Australia using locally grown sorghum, barley and wheat.

In 2019, Australian sorghum exported to China accounted for approximately 78.3 percent of Australia's total sorghum export market, which was valued at 29.9 million U.S. dollars. Exports of Australian sorghum to China are largely driven by demand for baijiu manufacture.

== Classification ==
=== By aroma profile ===
Throughout the evolutionary history of baijiu, numerous regional variations in alcohol production technique across the country have been incorporated into baijiu making. The practice of infusing alcohol with herbs, spices, fruits and other ingredients has its roots in traditional Chinese medicine, but is also done purely for flavor. The practice of infusing spirits is a common practice. Baijiu has a distinctive smell and taste that is highly valued in Chinese culinary culture, and connoisseurs focus especially on its fragrance. This classification system began in 1952 and was updated in August 1979 at the third nationwide baijiu competition held in Dalian. Even so, during the competition, experts rated various baijiu based on their taste rather than aroma.

There are 4 major categories of baijiu based on aroma profile:

1. Qingxiang (清香, qīngxiāng; light aroma, "Q-" is pronounced akin to "Ch-"):
  - Delicate, dry, and light, with a smooth and light mouthfeel.
  - The flavors of this distilled liquor is contributed primarily by ethyl acetate, ethyl lactate, and succinic acid and give the spirit a taste of dried fruit with floral notes.
  - It is made from sorghum fermented in a stone vessel with qu made from wheat, barley and peas.
  - The two primary styles of this liquor are Fenjiu (汾酒, fénjiǔ) from Shanxi and Erguotou (二锅头, èrguōtóu) from Beijing, the latter of which is known as Kaoliang (高粱, gāoliáng, lit. 'sorghum') in Taiwan. Formerly this style was called Fenxiang "Fen-aroma" (汾香, fēnxiāng) after the Shanxi Xinghuacun Fenjiu Distillery (杏花村汾酒).
2. Mixiang (米香, mǐxiāng; rice aroma):
  - This class of liquor is exemplified by baijiu distilled from rice, such as Sanhuajiu (三花酒) from Guilin, Guangxi province.
  - This fragrance has long history and is made using rice-based Rhizopus spp.-type Qu starters (小曲, xiǎoqū, lit. 'little qu).
  - It has a clean sensation and a slight aroma, dominated by ethyl lactate with lesser flavor contributions by ethyl acetate.
3. Nongxiang (濃香, nóngxiāng; strong aroma):
  - A class of distilled liquor that is sweet tasting and mellow, with a gentle lasting fragrance contributed by the high levels of esters, primarily ethyl hexanoate, which give the spirit a strong taste of pineapple, banana and anise.
  - Most alcohols of this aroma are distilled from sorghum, sometimes in combination with other grains, continuously fermented in mud pits.
  - This style is formerly known as Luxiang "Lu aroma" (泸香, lúxiāng), as it is thought to be invented in the Luzhou Laojiao Distillery in Luzhou, Sichuan province. Other notable examples of this type of liquor are Wuliangye from Yibin, Sichuan; Jiannanchun from Mianzhu, Sichuan; and Yanghe from Suqian, Jiangsu province. The Ming River Baijiu for the western market is also this category.
4. Jiangxiang (酱香, jiàngxiāng; sauce aroma):
  - A fragrant distilled sorghum liquor of bold character, named for its similarity in flavor to fermented bean pastes and soy sauces.
  - It is made from sorghum repeatedly fermented in stone brick pits. It has large amounts of ester compounds, which impart a layered umami flavor.
  - A highly controversial profile – like it or hate it. Not recommended for beginners but highly recommended for experienced drinkers. Some consider it as funky. It is an acquired taste, like peaty whisky.
  - To the initiated, it is considered a complement for preserved and pickled foods (酱菜, jiàngcài). This class was formerly known as Maoxiang "Mao-aroma" (茅香), after the best known spirit of this class, Maotai.

Various other niche aroma profiles:

- "Chi" xiang (豉香, chǐxiāng; douchi /douban flavored), or "Zhi" xiang (脂香, zhīxiāng; fat aroma):
  - Named after douchi, the popular Chinese condiment made from fermented bean, this is a savory rice-based baijiu from Guangdong notable for the addition of pork fat during the aging process.
- Fuyu xiang (馥郁香, fùyùxiāng; extra-strong aroma):
  - This category refers to the liquor produced by the Jiugui (酒鬼) Distillery in Hunan. Distilled from sorghum, rice, glutinous rice, wheat, and corn that has been fermented with big qu and medicinal small qu.
- "Laobaigan" xiang (老白干香, lǎobáigānxiāng; laobaigan aroma):
  - Similar to light-aroma baijiu, but fermented with wheat-based big qu and bottled at extremely high proof. Most often associated with the Hengshui Ruitian (衡水瑞天) Distillery in Hebei.
- Yao xiang (藥香, yàoxiāng; medicinal aroma):
  - A pungent liquor that originates at the Dongjiu (董酒) Distillery in Guizhou. Medicine aroma is distilled from the combination of two separate pit-fermented sorghum mashes, one fermented with wheat qu in a large pit and one fermented with medicinal rice qu in a small pit.
- Jian xiang (兼香, jiānxiāng; mixed aroma):
  - A class of distilled liquors that is a blend of two or more varieties of baijiu. As such, liquors of this class vary widely in their aroma, mouth-feel, and dryness.
- Feng xiang(鳳香, fèngxiāng; Xifeng style aroma):
  - A class of distilled liquor fermented in mud pits and aged in rattan containers. Liquors of this class have a fruity taste similar to strong-aroma baijiu, but also an earthier quality and an expanding finish. An example of this type of liquor is Xifengjiu from Fengxiang County in Shaanxi.
- Zhima xiang (芝麻香, zhīmaxiāng; sesame aroma):
  - A class of liquor distilled from sorghum, millet, or barley in stone pits with mud floors. Invented by the Jingzhi Distillery in the 1950s, sesame aroma employs similar production techniques to sauce-aroma baijiu, and has a charred, nutty flavor.
- Xiaoqu Qingxiang (小曲清香, xiǎoqū qīngxiāng; qingxiang with small-batched qu):
  - A style of baijiu distilled from sorghum that has been fermented with rice-based small qu.
- Te xiang (特香, tèxiāng; Si'te distillery special aroma):
  - A rice-based baijiu fermented in brick pits with big qu, it originates from the Si'te (四特) Distillery in Jiangxi, where the iconic Si'tejiu originated.

=== Regional varieties ===
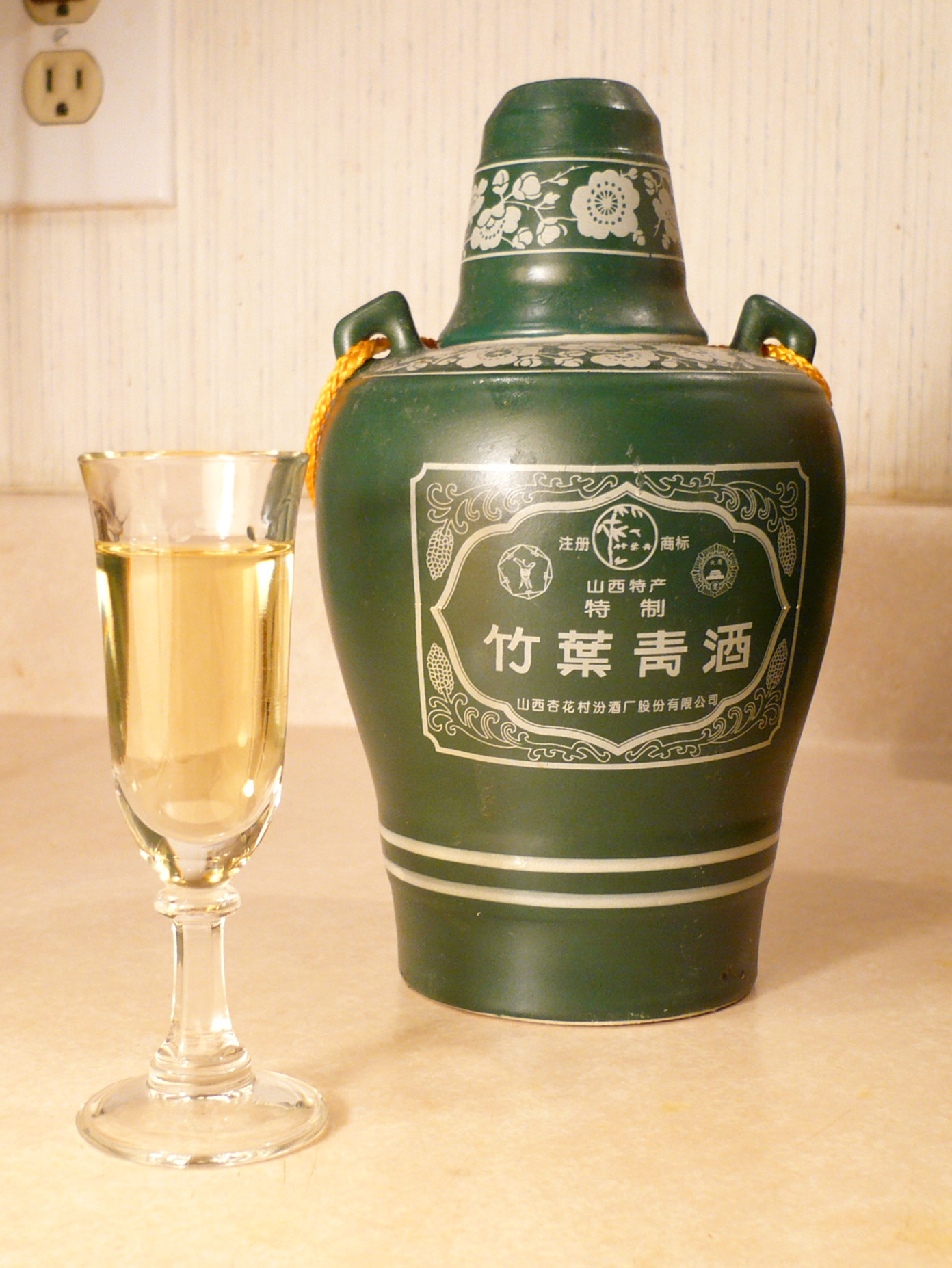
A glass and bottle of Zhuyeqingjiu (竹葉青酒), a Baijiu liqueur from the Xinghuacun Fenjiu Distilery.

Other than by aroma, Baijiu can also differ by styles, production methods, ingredients etc. Regional varieties of Baijiu are often somewhat unique in flavor profile and production method.

Some examples of regional varieties include:

- Daqujiu (大曲酒/大麴酒, Dàqūjiǔ): Originally from Sichuan. This liquor is made with sorghum and wheat qu and is fermented for two to three months in mud pits. Nongxiang type baijiu.
- Erguotou (二鍋頭, èrguōtóu, lit. "head of the second pot") is a variant of Qingxiang type baijiu. It is often inexpensive and thus particularly popular amongst blue-collar workers across northern and northeastern China. It is probably the most commonly-drunk baijiu in Beijing and is frequently associated with that city. Beijing Hongxing, more commonly referred to simply as "Hongxing" (红星, Red Star) is a popular brand.

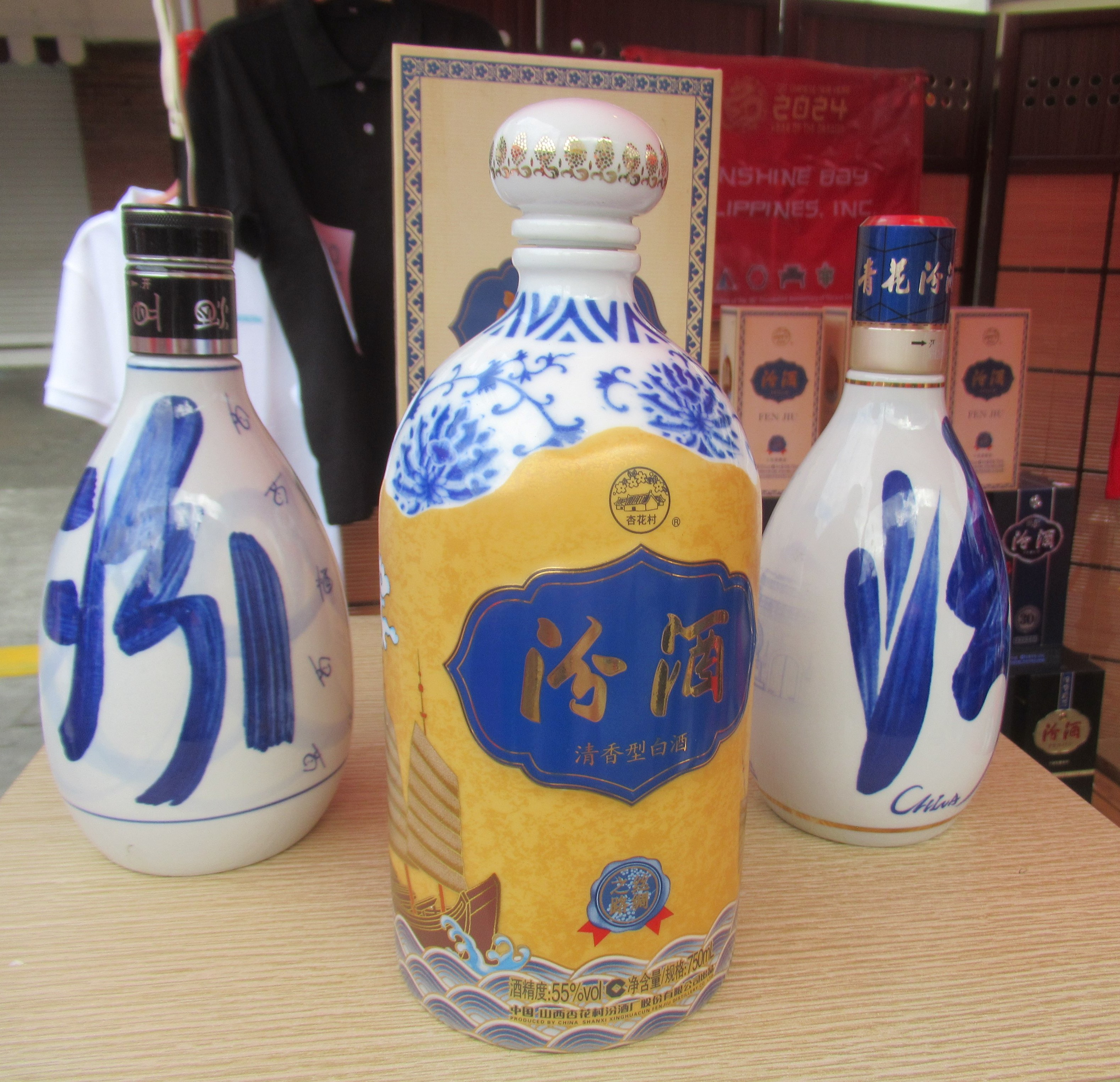
Fenjiu (汾酒, fénjiǔ) bottles popular in Sichuan made in Fenyang (in Quezon City Chinese New Year 2024)

- Fenjiu (汾酒, fénjiǔ): Grain alcohol in Fenyang, Shanxi dates back to the Northern and Southern dynasties (AD 550). Most commonly associated with the Xinghuacun Distillery, Fenjiu is a Qingxiang type sorghum baijiu fermented with qu made from barley and peas.
- Kaoliang (高粱酒, gāoliángjiǔ): Kaoliang is an old Romanized spelling for the Chinese word for sorghum, gaoliang (高粱). The liquor originates from Dazhigu (大直沽, east of Tianjin), first appearing in the Ming dynasty. Taiwan is the leading producer of Kaoliang liquor. It is a Qingxiang baijiu.
- Sanhuajiu (三花酒, Sānhuājiǔ, lit. "Three Flowers Liquor"):^{photo} a Mixiang type rice baijiu made in Guilin that borrows techniques from local rice wine tradition. It is famous for the fragrant herbal addition, and the use of spring water from Mount Xiang in the region.
- Shuangzhengjiu (双蒸酒/雙蒸酒, shuāngzhēngjiǔ, lit. "double-distilled liquor") and Sanzhengjiu (三蒸酒, sānzhēngjiǔ, lit. "triple-distilled liquor", formerly known as "samshu"): Two varieties of Mixiang baijiu from the area of Jiujiang in Jiangxi and in Guangdong, made by distilling twice and three times respectively. Alcohol content by volume: 32% and 38–39% respectively. "Samshu" was the name by which most foreign travelers knew baijiu during the Qing dynasty.

==== Popular infusions ====
Throughout the evolutionary history of baijiu, numerous regional variations in alcohol production technique across the country have been incorporated into baijiu making. The practice of infusing alcohol with herbs, spices, fruits and other ingredients has its roots in traditional Chinese medicine and herbology, but is also done purely for flavor. Infusing spirits is a common practice.

Floral infusions:

- Meiguilu jiu (玫瑰露酒, méiguīlujiǔ, lit. "nectar of the rose"): A variety of baijiu distilled with a special species of rose and crystal sugar. Alcohol content by volume: 54–55%.
- Guihuajiu (桂花酒) is a distilled liquor flavored with Guihua (a type of osmanthus) flowers. Its alcohol content is 17–18%.
- Tuweijiu (荼薇酒, túwēijiǔ) is a Cantonese liquor produced in Xiaolan Town near Zhongshan in Guangdong. It is made from Mixiang rice baijiu, with addedTuwei flowers and crystal sugar syrup. Aged for more than one year. 30% alcohol by volume.
- Chajiu (茶酒, chájiǔ, lit. "the tea baijiu") is a product of fairly recent origin. It consists of baijiu flavored with tea leaves and hawthorn berries. It is usually a light reddish-brown in color (similar to oolong tea) and varieties made with oolong, green, and black tea are available. Chajiu is produced by several manufacturers, primarily in the Sichuan province. Although the strength differs according to the brand and variety, chajiu ranges between 8–28% alcohol by volume.

Medicinal infusions:

- Wujiapi jiu (五加皮酒, Wǔjiāpíjiǔ): a variety of baijiu with a unique selection of Chinese herbal medicine (including Eleutherococcus gracilistylus and Angelica sinensis) added to the brew. Alcohol content by volume: 54–55%.
- Zhuyeqing jiu (竹叶青酒/竹葉青酒, zhúyèqīnqjiǔ, lit. "the green bamboo leaf"): this sweet liquor, produced in Shanxi, is made from Fenjiu brewed with a dozen or more selected Chinese herbal medicines. One of the ingredients is bamboo leaves, which gives the liquor a yellowish-green color and its name. Its alcohol content ranges between 38 and 46% by volume.
- Bilujiu (碧绿酒, bìlǜjiǔ, lit. "jade green liquor"): From Wuhan, this liquor is infused with Chinese medicinal herbs and sugar.
- Yulian baijiu (御蓮白酒, Yàlián báijiǔ): Named "Royal Lotus", this is a variety of baijiu infused with a selection of twenty medicinal herbs. It was first produced for the Chinese royal family in 1790.

== Baijiu brands ==
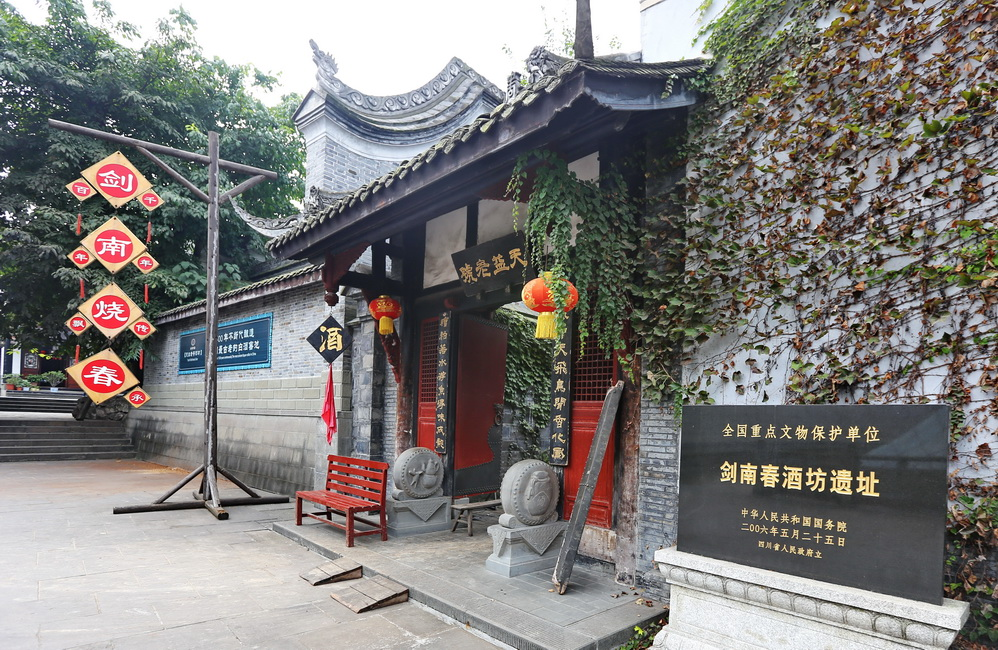
The remains of a historical Jiannanchun (剑南春) distillery.

Baijiu are often distinguishable by distillery. The distinct aroma and taste profile is likely to be the specialty of that region. Therefore, often the name of the brand is the same as the name of the baijiu and the distillery. However, bigger brands tend to have a series of different types of baijiu as well as their signature baijiu. Beginners are recommended to try the signature baijiu of the brand first, to learn about their style of baijiu making.

Due to its long history, almost every province in China has at least one regional specialty baijiu. However, Guizhou and Sichuan are the two biggest, particularly famous baijiu-making provinces, where numerous distilleries can be found. Below is a non-exhaustive list of relatively well-known Baijiu brands, grouped by place of origin, in descending order of popularity (semi-arbitrary and subjective).

*Many other brands exist, but usually only produced, sold and consumed locally and therefore lesser-known and not included in the list.

Guizhou:

- Kweichow Moutai (貴州茅臺, Guìzhōu Máotái): This liquor has a production history of over 200 years, and originally coming from the town of Maotai in Guizhou (formerly romanized as "Kweichow.") It is made from wheat and sorghum with a unique distilling process that involves seven iterations of the brewing cycle. This liquor became known to the world after winning a gold medal at the 1915 Panama-Pacific Exposition in San Francisco, California. Mao Zedong served Moutai at state dinners during Richard Nixon's state visit to China, and Henry Kissinger once remarked to Deng Xiaoping that, "if we drink enough Maotai, we can solve anything". Alcohol content by volume: 53%.
- Guizhou Xijiu (貴州習酒)
- Zhaiyao (摘要酒)
- Guotai (國台酒, Guotai Spirits) is distilled seven times to produce a crisp, clear flavor. The authentic spirit is made from wheat and a red sorghum cultivated in China's agricultural heartland. Guotai uses an ancient Chinese distillation process.

Sichuan:

- Wuliangye (五糧液, Wǔliángyè) is a strong, aged distilled liquor produced in the city of Yibin in southern Sichuan. Its factory includes a Liquor History Museum on its grounds. Wuliangye uses five grains (sorghum, rice, glutinous rice, corn, wheat) as its raw material, hence the name "Five-Grain Drink". The water which is used to brew Wuliangye is from the Min River. It has become one of the most famous liquor in china due to its unique taste.
- Shuijing Fang (水井坊)
- Jiannanchun (劍南春, jiàn nán chūn): Jiannanchun is baijiu produced in Mianzhu city, Sichuan province. Mianzhu in the Tang dynasty belongs to Jiannan zone, so-called "Jiannanchun". Liquor-making water is from Mianzhu northwest of the rare plateau water. The underground mineral water here is not affected by any foreign bacteria and surface water, forming the natural weak alkaline mineral water with excellent quality.
- Luzhou Laojiao (瀘州老窖): Luzhou Laojiao is one of the most popular liquors in China, with the history extending over 400 years. It is known for the quality of its distillation along with its unique aroma and mouth-feel, the latter of which is due to the clay used within the brewing environment, which infuses the spirit with its taste.
- Langjiu (郎酒)
- Shedejiu (舍得酒)

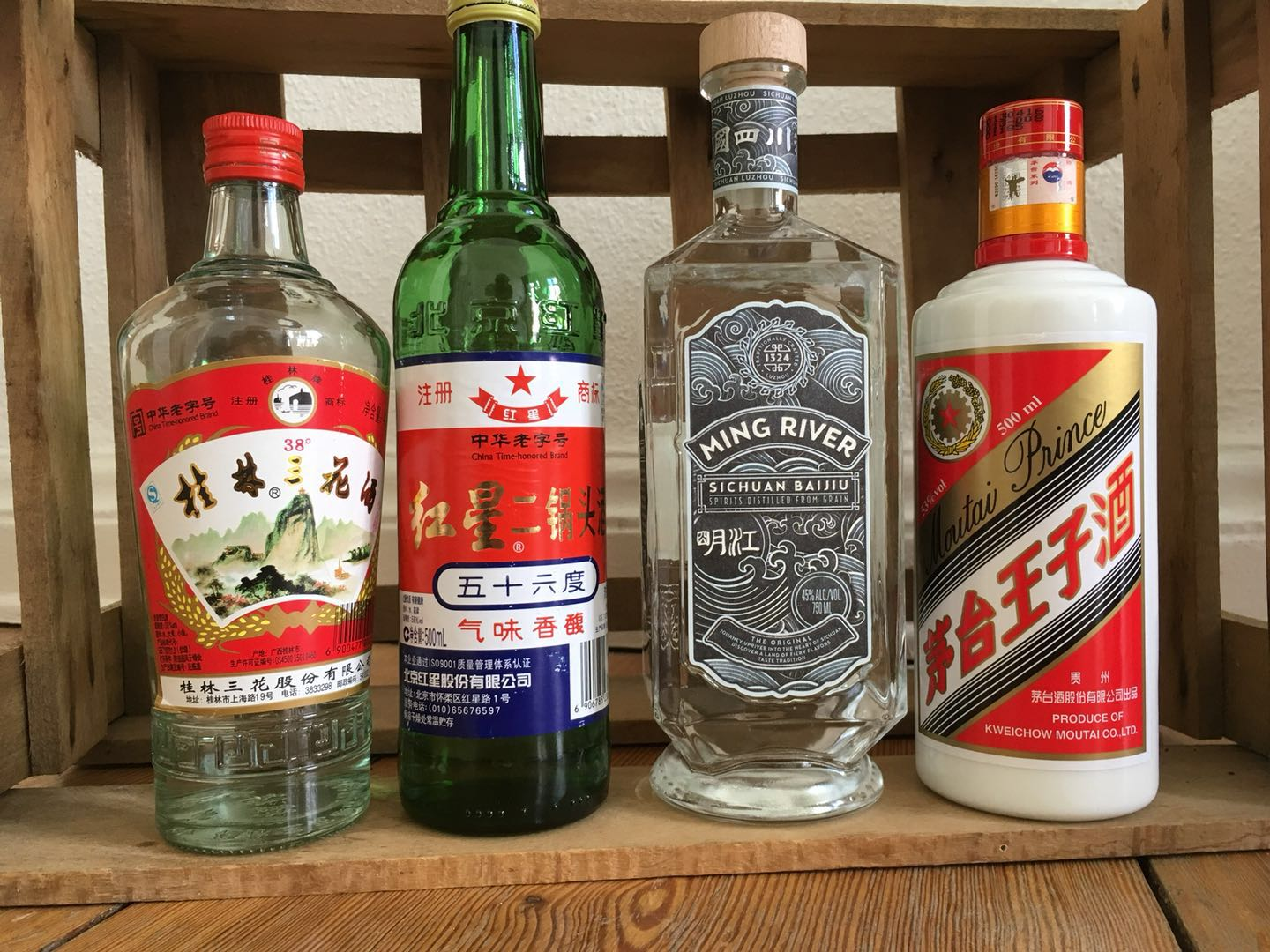
Bottles of various brands and types of baijiu, from left to right: Sanhuajiu from Guilin, Guangxi, Red Star Erguotou from Beijing, Ming River from Luzhou, Sichuan and Maotai from Maotai, Guizhou.

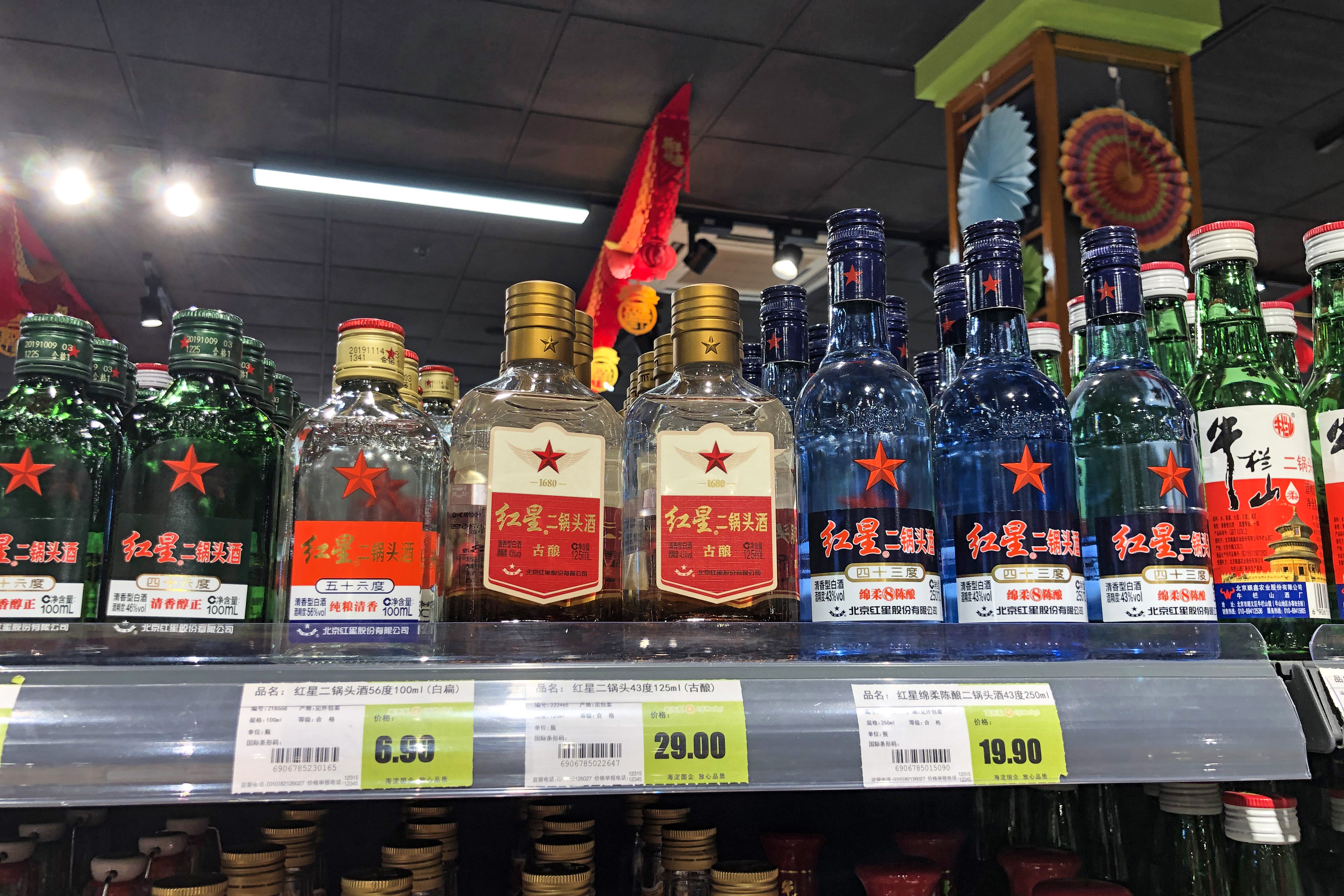
Bottles of Red Star and Niulanshan brands of Erguotou

Beijing:

- Beijing Hongxing (红星, hóng xīng) is an amalgamation of twelve distilleries, including the erguotou originator, Yuan Sheng Hao. It was issued the first business license in the People's Republic of China.
- Niulanshan (牛欄山, niú lán shān)

Hebei:

- Liulingzui Jiu (劉伶醉): Liulingzui originates from Wei and Jin dynasties. The wine is made by strictly following the traditional process of Five Utensils. Liulingzui has won a lot of prizes and awards: Special Gold Award of the Paris Exposition, the first batch of China Food Cultural Heritage, the first batch of China's Time-honored Brand, National Geographical Indication Products and the National Key Cultural Relics Protection Units.
- Laobaigan (老白干)

Hunan:

- Jiugui (酒鬼, jiǔguǐ, lit. "drunkard") is a clear distilled liquor made from spring water, sorghum, glutinous rice, and wheat. It is produced by the Hunan Jiugui Liquor Co., Ltd. in the town of Zhenwu near Jishou in the Xiangxi Tujia and Miao Autonomous Prefecture in the western part of Hunan. It ranges from 38 to 54% alcohol by volume.

Shanxi:

- Xinghuacun Fenjiu (杏花村汾酒)

Shaanxi:

- Xifengjiu (西鳳酒)

Anhui:

- Gujing-gongjiu (古井貢酒, gǔjǐinggongjiu, lit. "Ancient Well Tribute Liquor") is a traditional Chinese liquor made from water from a well in Bozhou, Anhui Province. The history began in Southern and Northern dynasty (AD196), people lived in Bozhou found that there was an old well that produced very clean and sweet, so they started using the water to produce the tea and grain wine. Then, it was famous in ancient China so people gave it to Emperor Xie Liu of Han as a tribute. It is produced by the Bozhou Gujinggongjiu Liquor Co., Ltd. at Anhui Province. It ranges from 38 to 50% alcohol by volume

Jiangxi:

- Site (四特)

Jiangsu:

- Yanghe (洋河, yánghé): Yanghe Daqu began to flourish in the Ming and Qing dynasties, and was presented as the tribute to Qing royals. After the founding of the country, the liquor was able to be enjoyed by citizens across the nation. Carrying on millennia of traditional craftsmanship, Yanghe Daqu uses only the highest quality sorghum as a base and only the best wheat, barley and peas as high-temperature fermenting agents.

Guangdong:

- Yuk Bing Siu Zau (玉冰燒酒, Yùbīng Shāojiǔ) or roulaoshao (肉醪燒, ròuláoshāo): a Cantonese rice liquor with over 100 years of history, made with steamed rice. After distillation, pork fat is stored with the liquor but removed before bottling. Its name probably derives from the brewing process: in Cantonese, "jade" (yuk) is a homophone of "meat", and bing means 'ice', which describes the appearance of the pork fat floating in the liquor. Cantonese rice wine breweries prospered in the Northern Song dynasty, when the Foshan area was exempted from alcohol tax. Alcohol content by volume: 30%.

== Western perception ==
Outside of East Asia, baijiu is widely regarded as an acquired taste. In response to one 2015 article in The New York Times, third-party commenters compared baijiu's aroma and taste profile to "jet fuel, kerosene, poison, nail polish remover, drain cleaner, Burgundy cheeses, and salty garbage water", and the tenor of these remarks was "representative of most English-language writing about baijiu at the time". Such harsh critiques have been disputed by Western experts on baijiu, who believe Westerners are shocked and repulsed by baijiu's unexpectedly intense flavor because they expect a clear liquor to have a mild flavor similar to vodka. These experts prefer to compare baijiu to Western liquors with strong flavors and aromas, such as peaty whisky, Scotch whisky, grappa, or tequila. Additionally, some believe these negative judgments are reflective of broader Western attitudes toward Chinese cuisine. They argue the opinions of the hundreds of millions of people who enjoy baijiu should be given as much weight as the opinions of foreign critics.

== See also ==
- Chinese alcoholic beverages
- Wine in China
- Huangjiu
- Mijiu
- Soju
- Shōchū
