= Ultimate Beverage Challenge =

Alcohol competition

- Industry: Beverage
- Founded: 2009; 17 years ago
- Founders: F. Paul Pacult; David Talbot; Sue Woodley
- Defunct: 2023
- Headquarters: New York, U.S.
- Area served: Worldwide
- Products: Ultimate Spirits Challenge
- Website: ultimate-beverage.com

Ultimate Beverage Challenge was an American organization that conducted Ultimate Wine Challenge and Ultimate Spirits Challenge until 2023. It was based in New York, United States.

== History ==
Ultimate Beverage Challenge was founded in 2009 by F. Paul Pacult, David Talbot, and Sue Woodley. It was first held in 2010.

In 2012, Financial Times called Ultimate Wine Challenge a "highly selective" challenge. In 2021, the competition received entries from 52 countries.

== Competitions ==
- Ultimate Spirits Challenge
- Ultimate Wine Challenge

== Judging process ==
Eligible products included all categories of spirits; aperitifs; vermouths; fortified wines such as port and sherry; ready-to-drink and pre-mixed cocktails; non-alcoholic mixers and beverages; and hard seltzers. Sample bottles without final packaging or labels, and products without a U.S. importer or distributor, were also accepted.

The judging process was based upon blind tasting in small flights. Entries are evaluated by multiple expert panels over an extended period. All tastings took place at Ultimate Beverage Challenge's facility, designed specifically for product evaluation. Products were scored on a 100-point scale. Detailed tasting notes were provided for products scoring 85 points or higher.

== Recipients ==
=== Chairman's Trophy ===
- Slovenia Vodka (2013)
- Remus Repeal Reserve (2018, Bourbon)
- The Glenrothes 25 Year Old (2018, Speyside Single Malt)

=== Great Value Award ===
- Mezzacorona
- Heaven Hill Bottled-in-Bond 7 years Old Kentucky Straight Bourbon
- Jameson Black Barrel Irish Blended Whiskey
- Appleton Estate Signature Rum
- Fords London Dry Gin

== Awards ==
- Chairman's Trophy Award
- Finalist
- Great Value
- Top 100 Spirits

== Notable judges ==
- F. Paul Pacult
- Dale DeGroff
- Meaghan Dorman
- Will Shine
- Charlotte Voisey
