= Fermentation starter =

Preparation to assist the beginning of fermentation

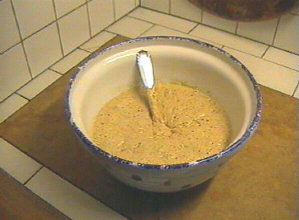
Pain poolish—a type of fermentation starter for bread

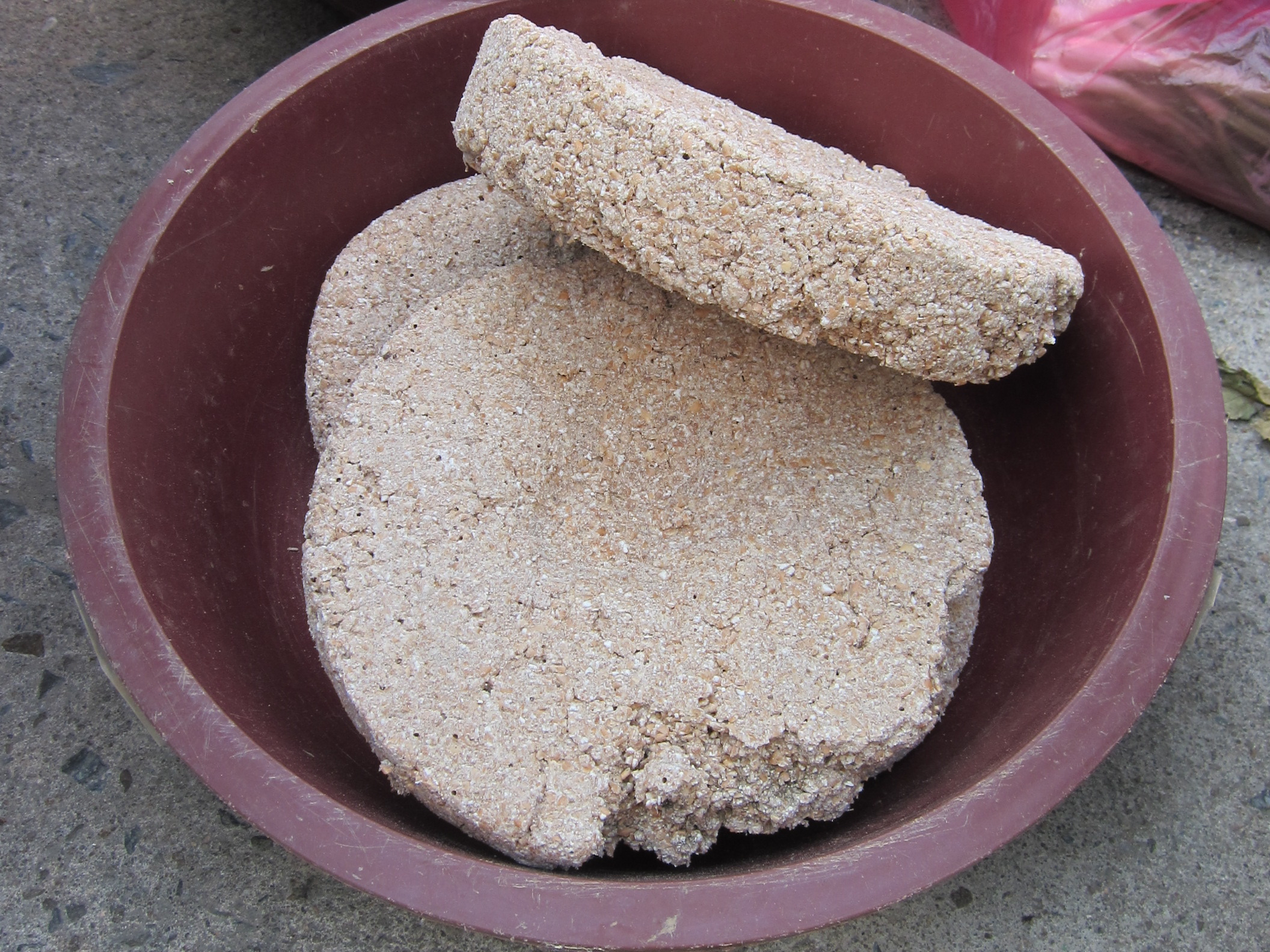
Nuruk, a fermentation starter for alcoholic beverages

A fermentation starter (called simply starter within the corresponding context, sometimes called a mother) is a preparation to assist the beginning of the fermentation process in preparation of various foods and alcoholic drinks. Food groups where they are used include breads, especially sourdough bread, and cheese. A starter culture is a microbiological culture which actually performs fermentation. These starters usually consist of a cultivation medium, such as grains, seeds, or nutrient liquids that have been well colonized by the microorganisms used for the fermentation.

These starters are formed using a specific cultivation medium and a specific mix of fungal and bacterial strains.

Typical microorganisms used in starters include various bacteria and fungi (yeasts and molds): Rhizopus, Aspergillus, Mucor, Amylomyces, Endomycopsis, Saccharomyces, Hansenula anomala, Lactobacillus, Acetobacter, etc. Various national cultures have various active ingredients in starters, and often involve mixed microflora.

Industrial starters include various enzymes, in addition to microflora.

== National names ==
In descriptions of national cuisines, fermentation starters may be referred to by their national names:

- Qū (simplified: 曲; traditional: 麴, also romanized as chu) (China)
  - Jiuqu (simplified Chinese: 酒曲; traditional Chinese: 酒麴; pinyin: jiǔ qū): the starter used for making Chinese alcoholic beverages
  - Laomian (simplified Chinese: 老面; traditional Chinese: 老麵; pinyin: lǎomiàn; lit. 'old dough' pinyin: mianfei; lit. 'dough fat'): Chinese sourdough starter commonly used in Northern Chinese cuisine, the sourness of the starter is commonly quenched with sodium carbonate prior to use.
- Mae dombae or mae sra (Khmer: ម៉ែស្) (Cambodia)
- Meju (메주) (Korea)
- Nuruk (누룩) (Korea)
- Koji (麹) (Japan)
- Ragi tapai (Indonesia and Malaysia)
- Bakhar, ranu, marchaar (murcha), Virjan (India)
- Bubod, tapay, budbud (Philippines)
- Loogpaeng, loog-pang, or look-pang (Thai: ลูกแป้ง) (Thailand)
- Levain (France)
- Bread zakvaska (закваска, sourdough) (Russia, Ukraine) or zakwas (Poland)
- Opara (опара), a starter based on yeast (Russia)
- Juuretis (Estonia)

== See also ==
- Bread starter
- Leaven
- Malting
- Symbiotic culture of bacteria and yeast
