= Wuliangye =

Chinese baijiu distillery

Wuliangye 五粮液
- Company type: Public; State-Owned Enterprise
- Traded as: SZSE: 000858
- Industry: Alcoholic Beverages
- Founded: 1952; 74 years ago
- Headquarters: Yibin, Sichuan, China
- Area served: Worldwide
- Key people: Zeng Congqin (Chairman) (Committee Secretary)
- Products: Baijiu
- Revenue: ▲(2022); CN¥73.97 billion US$23.12 billion
- Number of employees: 46,678 (2022)
- Website: wuliangye.com.cn

Wuliangye
- Simplified Chinese: 五粮液
- Traditional Chinese: 五糧液
- Literal meaning: Five Grain Liquid
Transcriptions
Standard Mandarin
- Hanyu Pinyin: wǔ liáng yè
- Wade–Giles: wu^{3} liang^{2} ye^{4}
Yue: Cantonese
- Jyutping: ng5 loeng4 jik6

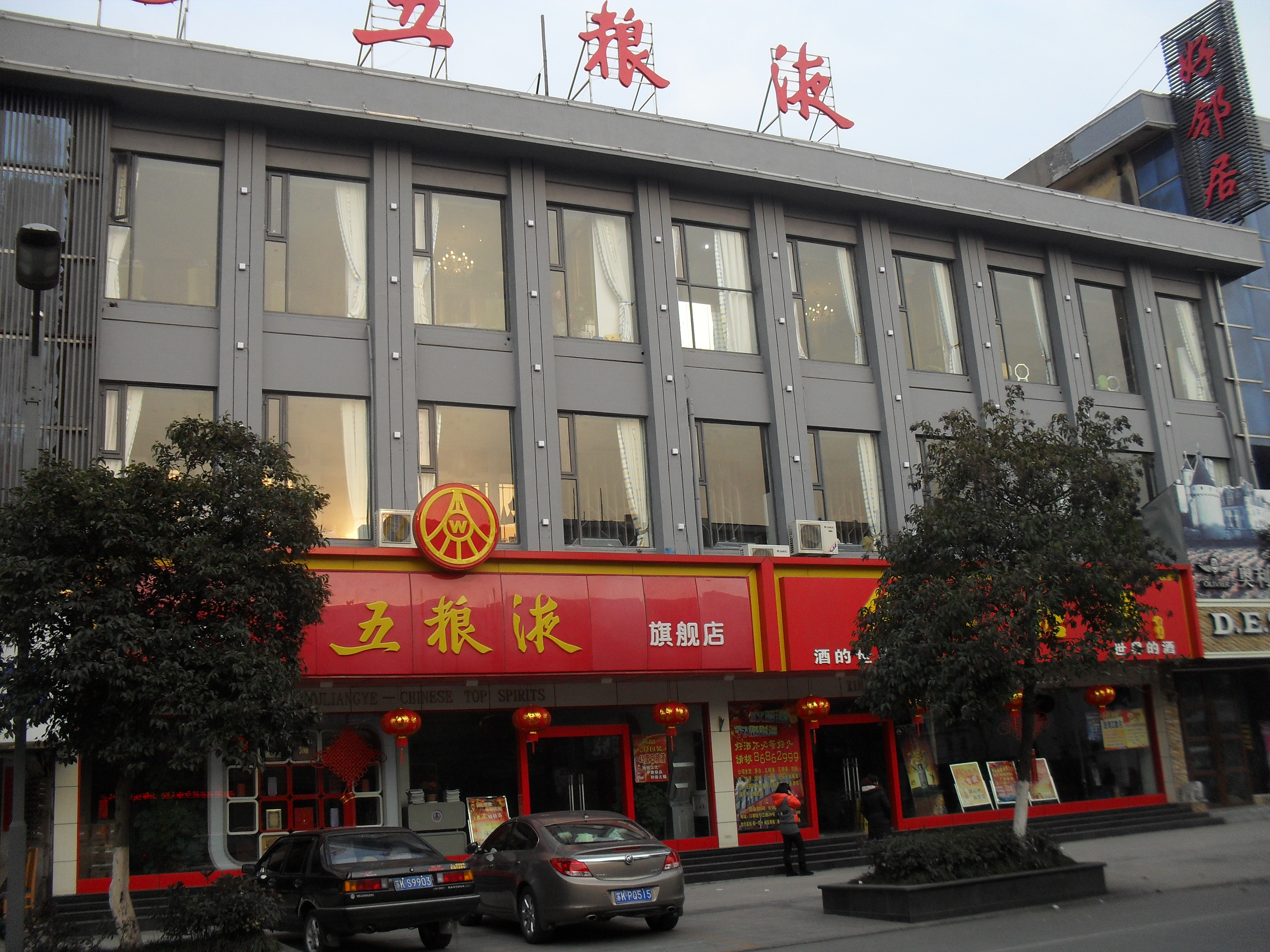
Wuliangye Yibin liquor store in Yangzhou

Wuliangye Yibin Co. Ltd. (Chinese: 宜宾五粮液股份有限公司), or simply Wuliangye (Chinese: 五粮液; lit. 'Five Grain Liquid') is a baijiu distillery headquartered in Yibin, Sichuan, China. The distillery's eponymous and proprietary spirit, Wuliyangye, is a nongxiang (濃香; strong aroma) baijiu made with a mix of five cereal grains: sorghum, rice, glutinous rice, wheat, and corn. Wuliangye is one of the most popular baijiu brands both in China and abroad and as of 2023 is the second most valuable spirits brand in the world. It ranked 15th on the World Brand Lab's 2023 list of "China's 500 Most Valuable Brands".

Wuliangye lays out the global market system. The China market covers seven major marketing areas, 21 marketing theaters, and 58 marketing bases; the international market has established international marketing centers in Europe, America, Asia-Pacific and other places, and its products are directly sold to 56 duty-free shops abroad, with distribution business covering more than 100 countries.

== Product characteristics ==
Wuliangye produces primarily nongxiang baijiu which, due to the grains long fermentation periods in mud pits, has a high amount, both in variation and in concentration of ethyl compounds, primarily ethyl hexanoate, ethyl lactate, ethyl acetate, and ethyl butyrate. The result is their eponymously named flagship "Wuliangye" having floral and peppery notes in the aroma and notes of pineapple and licorice on the palate.

== History ==
Yibin and the region of Sichuan as a whole has a long history of alcohol production. While some archaeologists speculate about production of alcohol, likely spontaneously fermented lizhijiu, among the ancient Bo people, the earliest hard evidence for the consumption of alcohol comes from the Han dynasty from which hundreds of drinking vessels and ceramics for the purpose of storing alcohol has been found.

Over time as the techniques of brewing, and eventually distillation developed, the technique of using multiple grains as the base for fermentation became a regular practice. During the Tang dynasty a multiple grain alcohol called "Zhongbijiu" (重碧酒) had some popularity and during the Song dynasty Yao Junyu (姚君玉), a Yibin nobleman, building on the formula for zhongbijiu, developed "Yaozixuequ" (子雪曲), a distilled spirit composed of five grains; sorghum, rice, glutinous rice, wheat, and millet, which saw a great deal of commercial popularity and success. In the Ming dynasty, the Chen family took over production of yaozixuequ and in 1368 built fermentation pits that continue to be in use to this day. The Chen family also altered the recipe setting the baseline for the spirit that would come to be known as Wuliangye however, it wasn't until 1909, the very tail end of the Qing dynasty, that a scholar at a Yibin banquet named Yang Huiquan (杨惠泉) gave the spirit its current name.

In 1950, the newly formed People's Republic merged eight Yibin distilleries under a single state owned entity and in 1959 this company was named Wuliyangye after the spirit itself.

In 1995, Wuliangye, Changhong, China FAW and other enterprises ranked first in the same industry in the country for both total sales and total profits and taxes. They were ranked first in the same industry in the country by the National Bureau of Statistics, the China Organizing Committee of the 50th International Conference on Statistics, and the China Technology Progress Evaluation Center. Jointly awarded the titles of "Liquor King of China", "Color TV King of China" and "Automobile King of China".

In 1998, Wuliangye Distillery was restructured into Wuliangye Group and Wuliangye Yibin Co. Ltd.; in the same year, the joint-stock company was listed on the Shenzhen Stock Exchange.

As of 2023, Wuliangye has seen much commercial success and currently sits at #164 on the "Fortune China 500."

== Products ==
Wuliangye is dedicated to building a complete combination of liquor varieties worldwide and covers liquor from low-alcohol to high-alcohol concentration, namely, 39°, 45°, 52°, 56°, 60°, 68°, and 72°. Wuliangye brand “1+3” product strategy: “1” is the generation-specific Wuliangye with the eighth-generation Wuliangye as the signature product; “3” is the super high-end Baijiu series produced from fermentation pits built in the Ming dynasty, with 501 Wuliangye as the signature; vintage Baijiu series with the classic Wuliangye as the signature and cultural customized Baijiu series with Chinese Zodiac Wuliangye as the signature. Wuliang strong aromatic Baijiu brand “4+4” product strategy: including 4 National Strategic Brands of Wuliangchun, Wuliangchun, Wuliangtequ, Jianzhuang, and 4 Regional Key Brands supplemented by Wuliang Renjia, Youjiu, Baijiayan and Huobao. Wuliangye Xining ecological brand “1+2+2” product strategy: including Wuliangbencao brand as the strategic core, 2 key brands of Longhu and Shangxuan as the basis, and 2 brands(fruit wine and wine) of Xining and Yahoo as the representatives, build a multi-category composite brand architecture.

=== Ultra-high-end products ===
- 501 Wuliangye

=== Core products ===
- Classic Wuliangye
- Wuliangye
- Wuliangye 1618

=== Baijiu series products ===
- Wuliangchun
- Wuliang Tequ
- Jianzhuang
