= Luzhou Laojiao =

Chinese baijiu distillery

Luzhou Laojiao 泸州老窖
- Type: Public; State-Owned Enterprise
- Traded as: SZSE: 000568
- Industry: Alcoholic Beverages
- Founded: 1950; 76 years ago
- Headquarters: Luzhou, Sichuan, China
- Area served: Worldwide
- Key people: Liu Miao (Chairman) (Committee Secretary)
- Products: Baijiu
- Revenue: ▲(2022); CN¥25.12 billion US$3.73 billion
- Number of employees: 3,605 (2022)
- Website: lzjl.com (Chinese) lzljglobal.com (Global)

Luzhou Laojiao
- Simplified Chinese: 泸州老窖
- Traditional Chinese: 瀘州老窖
- Literal meaning: Luzhou Old Cellar
Transcriptions
Standard Mandarin
- Hanyu Pinyin: lú zhōu lǎo jiào
- Wade–Giles: lu^{2} chou^{1} lao^{3} chiao^{4}

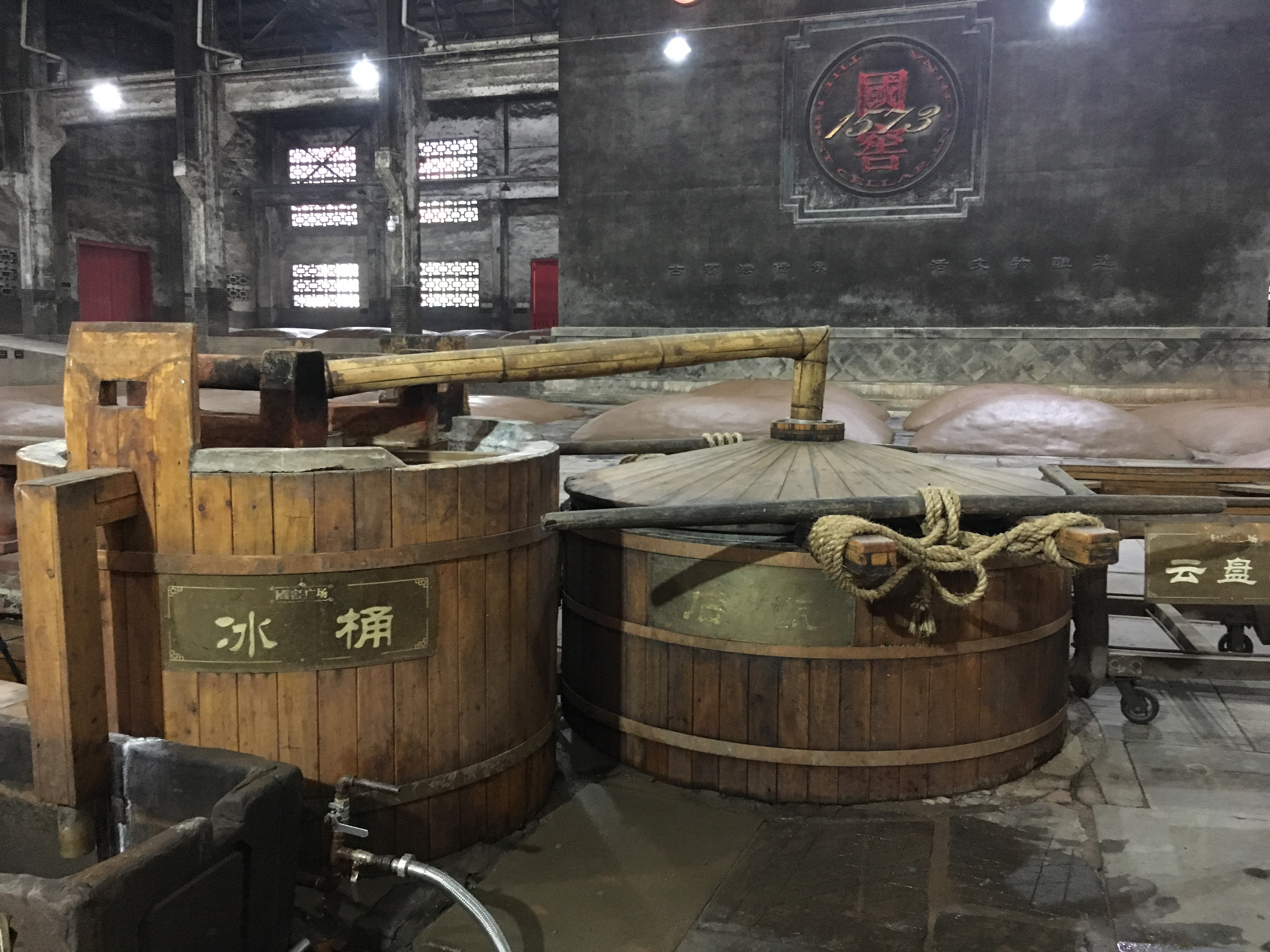
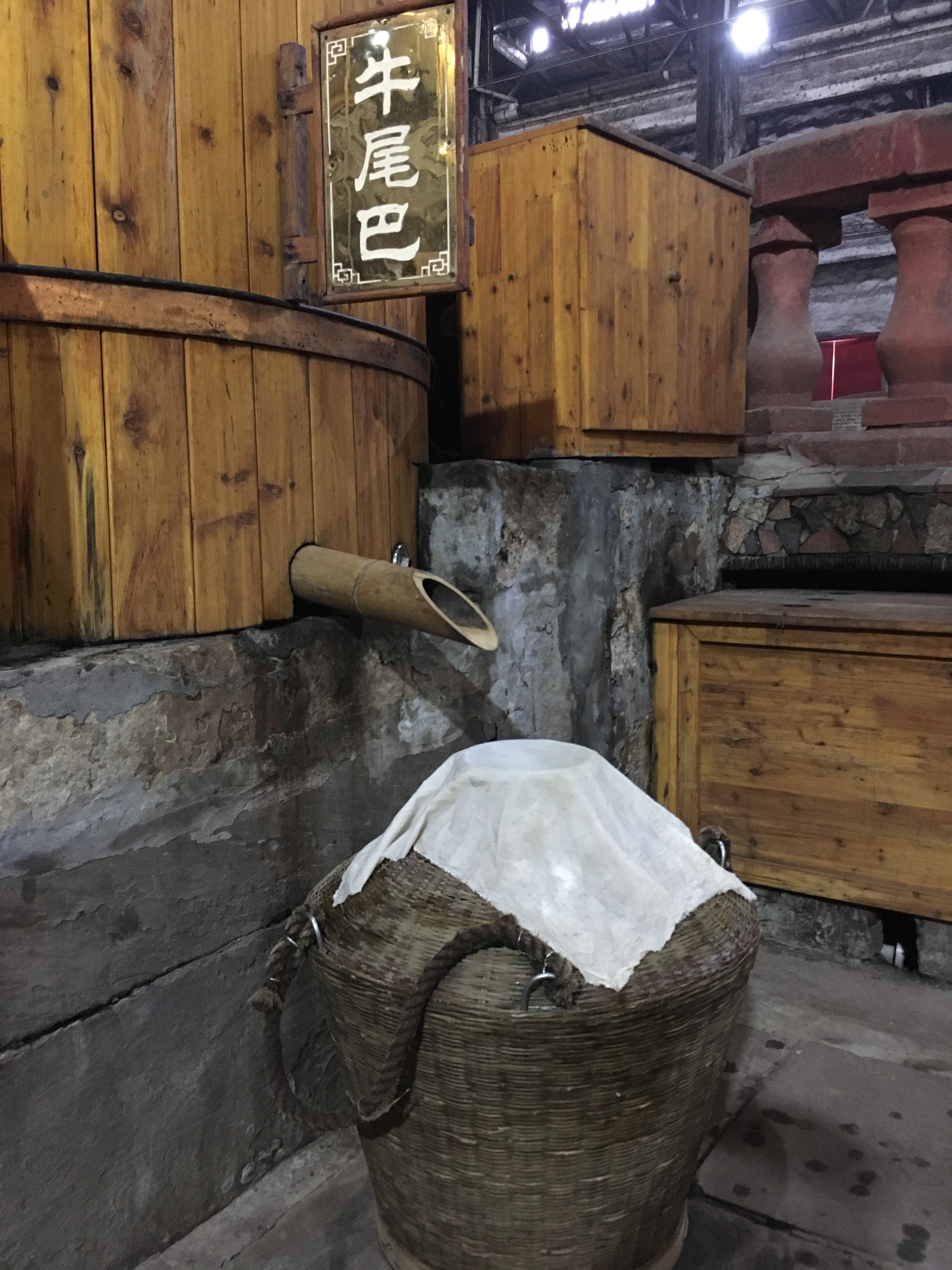
An exhibit of the traditional distillation apparatus at Luzhou Laojiao

Luzhou Laojiao Co. Ltd. (Chinese: 泸州老窖股份有限公司), or simply Luzhou Laojiao (Chinese: 泸州老窖; lit. 'Luzhou Old Cellar') is a company headquartered in Luzhou, Sichuan, China that specializes in the production, sale, and distribution of baijiu. The distillery produces baijiu that is characteristic of the Nongxiang (Chinese: 濃香; lit. 'strong aroma') style of baijiu; so much so that the category had originally been named "luxiang" (Chinese: 泸香; lit. 'lu aroma') for the Luzhou Laojiao distillery itself where it was believed the style had been developed. Today Luzhou Laojiao is ranked as the fourth most valuable spirits brand internationally.

== History ==
The distillery dates back to 1573, in the Ming dynasty, and it is the oldest continuously producing baijiu distillery in the world. It was included in the first "List of National Intangible Cultural Heritage" in 2006. The company produces a baijiu brand named Guojiao 1573 (国窖 1573, 'National Cellar 1573'), in commemoration of its founding year.

Luzhou Laojiao was reportedly the favourite liquor of China's paramount leader, Deng Xiaoping.

The company commenced international operations in 2012, concentrating initially on the Asia-Pacific market but expanding into Africa during 2016–17. In 2018 it was estimated to be worth nearly CN¥100 billion (US$15.75 billion).

In 2019, Luzhou Laojiao became an associate sponsor of the Australian Open tennis tournament for five years, making it the largest Chinese sponsor in Australian Open history. Court 2 at the tournament's Melbourne Park venue was named the "1573 Arena", after the company's Guojiao 1573 brand, starting from the 2019 Australian Open.

== Product characteristics ==
Luzhou Laojiao is a complex, premium baijiu of the "strong aroma" (nóngxiāng) class. It is a strongly alcoholic (more than 50% alcohol), clear liquid with a sharp aroma of fermented peaches. It is fermented in old cellars (fermentation pits), whose walls are coated with a unique clay composition that gives the spirit its aroma and palate.

Luzhou has a mild climate with extreme temperatures of -1 to +40 °C (30 to 105 °F), and annual precipitation of 750 to 1615mm (30 to 65in). This climate is ideal for local soft cereal quality and microbial groups. The Yangtze River water, after treatment by the water plant, is rich in calcium, magnesium and other trace elements. Water quality is weakly acidic, with a suitable hardness.

== Products ==
Guojiao1573/国窖1573

- Jingdian Zhuang (經典裝;"Classic Outfit")
  - Nongxiang Baijiu
  - 38%/52% abv
  - High end bottling made in fermentation cellars which have been in continuous use since 1573 and aged a minimum of five years.
- Zhongguo Pinwei (中国品味;"Taste of China")
  - Nongxiang Baijiu
  - 52% abv
  - Commemorative bottling made in honor of the 1573 Cellars inclusion in the UN preliminary world tangible cultural heritage list. Made in the 1573 Cellars and aged for a minimum of 10 years.

Luzhou Laojiao/泸州老窖

- Erqu (二曲;"second Qu")
  - Qingxiang Baijiu
  - 52% abv
  - Entry level offering, developed with mass consumption in mind.
- Dah Chu Chiew (大曲;"Big Qu")
  - Nongxiang Baijiu
  - 52% abv
  - Marketed as an iconic export product.
- Zisha Daqu (紫砂大曲; "Zisha Big Chu")
  - Nongxiang Baijiu
  - 52% abv
  - Bottled in zisha clay as to allow baijiu to better develop with age.
- Bainian (百年;"Century")
  - Nongxiang Baijiu
  - 52% abv
  - Made in tribute to the recognition of Luzhou brewing techniques as a part of national intangible cultural heritage.
- Jiao Ling 60 Nian (窖龄60年;"Cellar Aged 60 Years")
  - Nongxiang Baijiu
  - 52% abv
  - Made in fermentation cellars that were built in the 1950s and have been in continuous use for over 60 years.
- Tequ (特曲;"Special Qu")
  - Nongxiang Baijiu
  - 52% abv
  - Flagship mid-range bottling.
- 1952
  - Nongxiang Baijiu
  - 52% abv
  - Flagship mid-range bottling.

Brands for International Export

- Ming River
  - Nongxiang Baijiu
  - 45% abv
  - Classic nongxiang blended and proofed down with the western palate in mind.
- Ni Hao Baijiu
  - Quingxiang Baijiu
  - 40% abv
  - Small 200mL bottle intended to introduce baijiu to western audiences.
