= Niulanshan Distillery =

Chinese baijiu distillery

Niulanshan 牛栏山
- Type: State Owned Enterprise; Subsidiary
- Industry: Alcoholic Beverages
- Founded: 26 October 1952; 73 years ago
- Headquarters: Niulanshan, Beijing, China
- Area served: Worldwide
- Key people: Song Kewei (Committee Secretary)
- Products: Baijiu
- Owner: Beijing Shunxin Agriculture Co. Ltd.
- Website: niulanshan.com.cn

Niulanshan Distillery
- Simplified Chinese: 牛栏山
- Traditional Chinese: 牛欄山
- Literal meaning: Golden Ox Mountain
Transcriptions
Standard Mandarin
- Hanyu Pinyin: niú lán shān
- Wade–Giles: niu^{2} lan^{2} shan^{1}

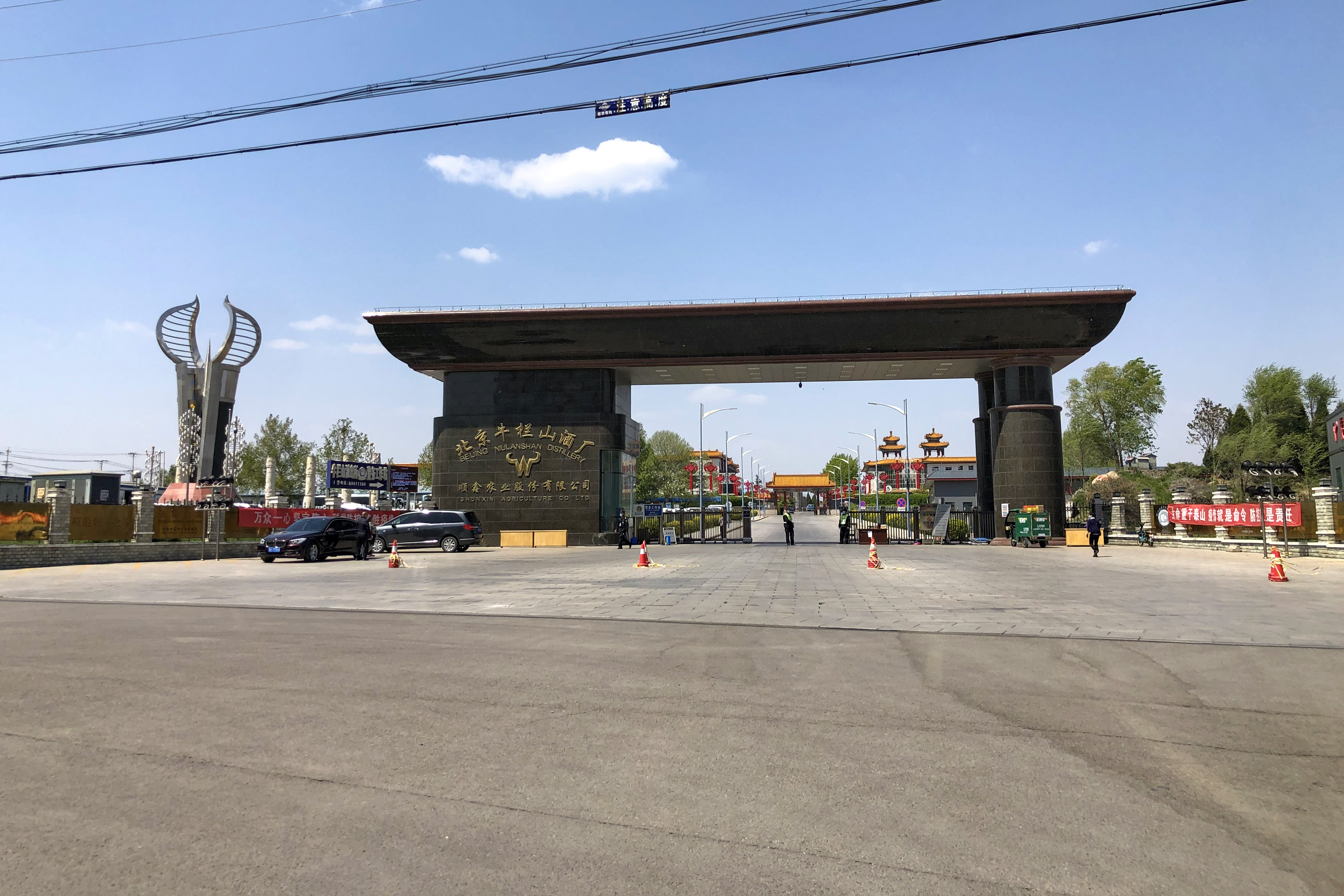
Niulanshan Distillery Main Entrance

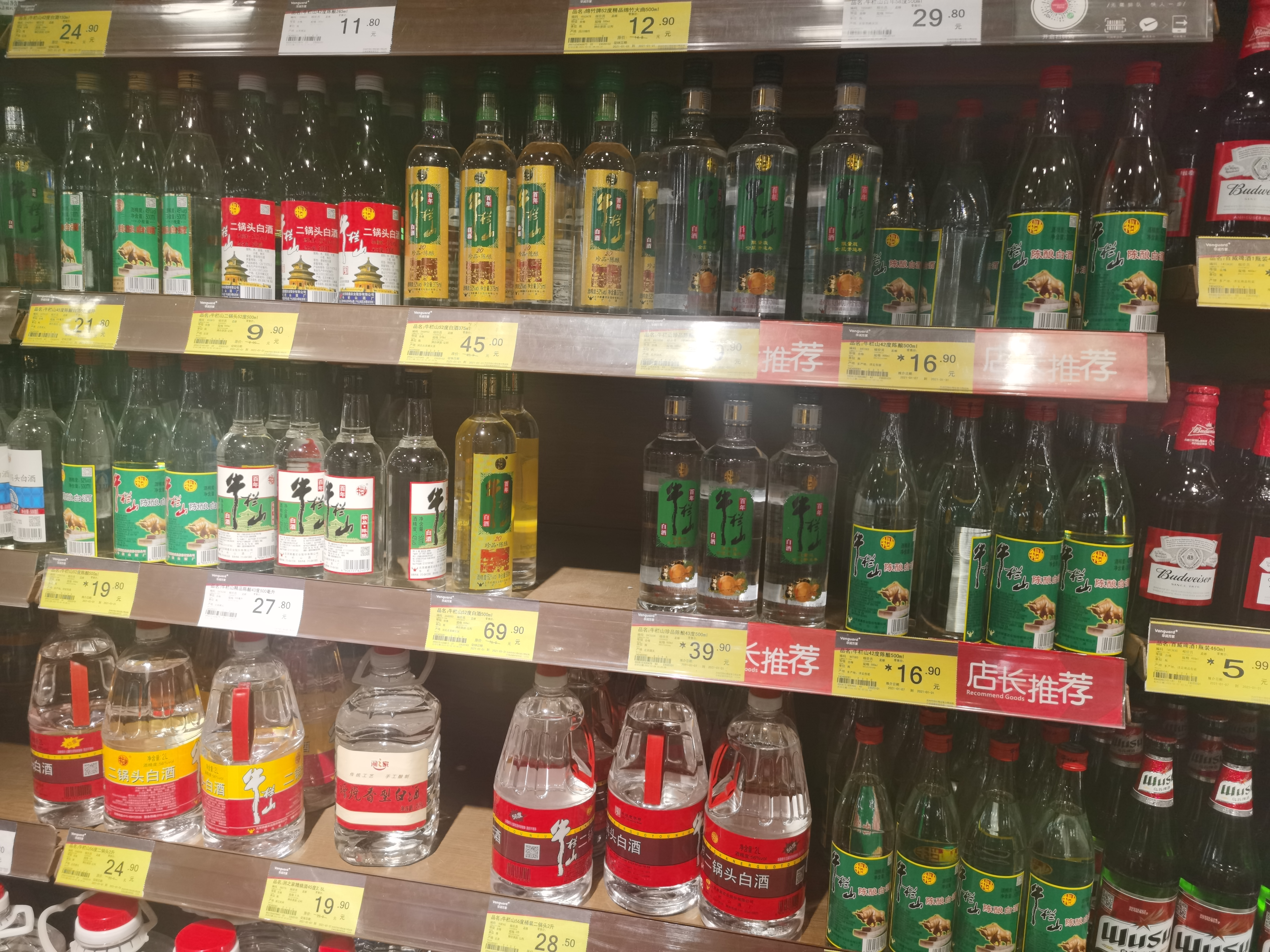
Various Niulanshan products being sold at a shop in Suzhou

Niulanshan Distillery (Chinese: 牛栏山酒厂), known simply as Niulanshan (Chinese: 牛栏山; lit. 'Golden Ox Mountain') is a baijiu distillery headquartered in Niulanshan, Beijing, China. Known for their erguotou and "Bainiu Er"(白牛二) a very popular, affordable peizhijiu (配制酒; "prepared spirit"), they are one of the top selling brands in Beijing in terms of volume. Due to their primary product by positioned in the low cost erguotou market, they are in direct competition with Beijing Hongxing.

== History ==
Although the contemporary Niulanshan was founded in 1952, Niulanshan inherited a centuries old legacy of liquor production and consumption in Niulanshan. In 1982, an archaeological excavation in the area adjacent to Niulanshan recovered several ancient drinking vessels, including Zhi and Jue, dating back to the Zhou dynasty, 3,000 years ago. During the Qing dynasty, in 1719, an article in the "Shunyi County Chronicle" detailing production of alcohol in the region reported that "Wine-making workers: There are about a hundred people doing this (employed by eleven pot-making houses in the region).""There are abou 100 people employed in wine production, employed by 11 breweries." producing a specialty wine of the town that had gained some renown in the region. In 1952, after the state monopolization of liquor production, four Baijiu distilleries, Gongli, Fushuncheng, Yixin, and Kuisheng were merged into a single entity that became the modern Niulanshan distillery. The brand has seen a rapid increase in growth over the last 25 years with annual revenue first reaching over ¥10 billion CNY ($1 billion USD) in 2019.
