= Erguotou =

Style of baijiu

Erguotou 二锅头
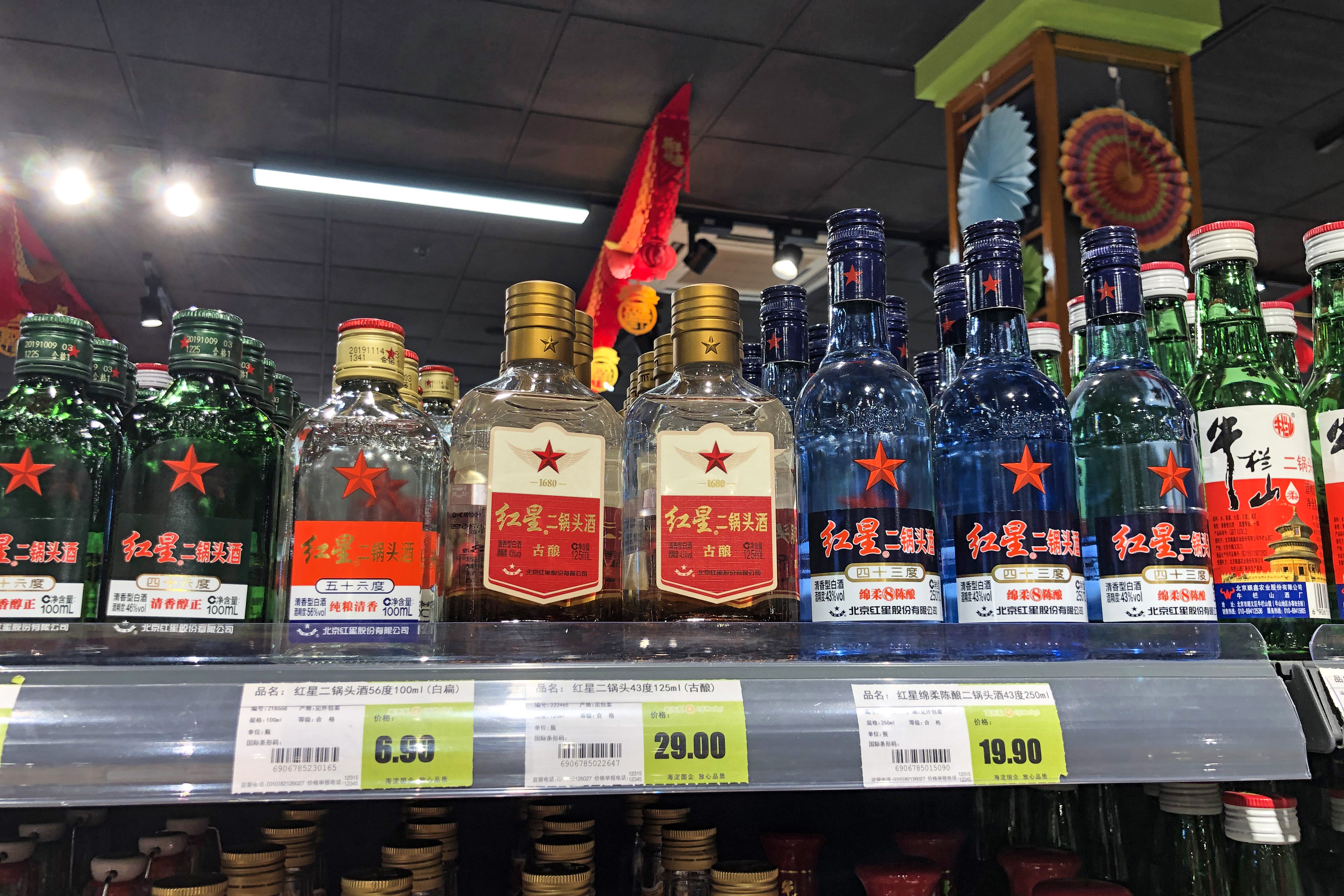
- Bottles of the two most famous brands of erguotou, Red Star and Niulanshan (at far right)
- Type: Baijiu, Qingxiang
- Manufacturer: Beijing Hongxing, Niulanshan, Beijing Erguoutou, Huadu, Xinhuamen, and others.
- Origin: China, Beijing
- Introduced: Qing Dynasty
- Alcohol by volume: 42–65%
- Colour: Clear
- Ingredients: Sorghum

Erguotou
- Simplified Chinese: 二锅头
- Traditional Chinese: 二鍋頭
- Literal meaning: "second pot head" (second distillation)
Transcriptions
Standard Mandarin
- Hanyu Pinyin: èrguōtóu
- IPA: [âɚ.kwó.tʰǒʊ]

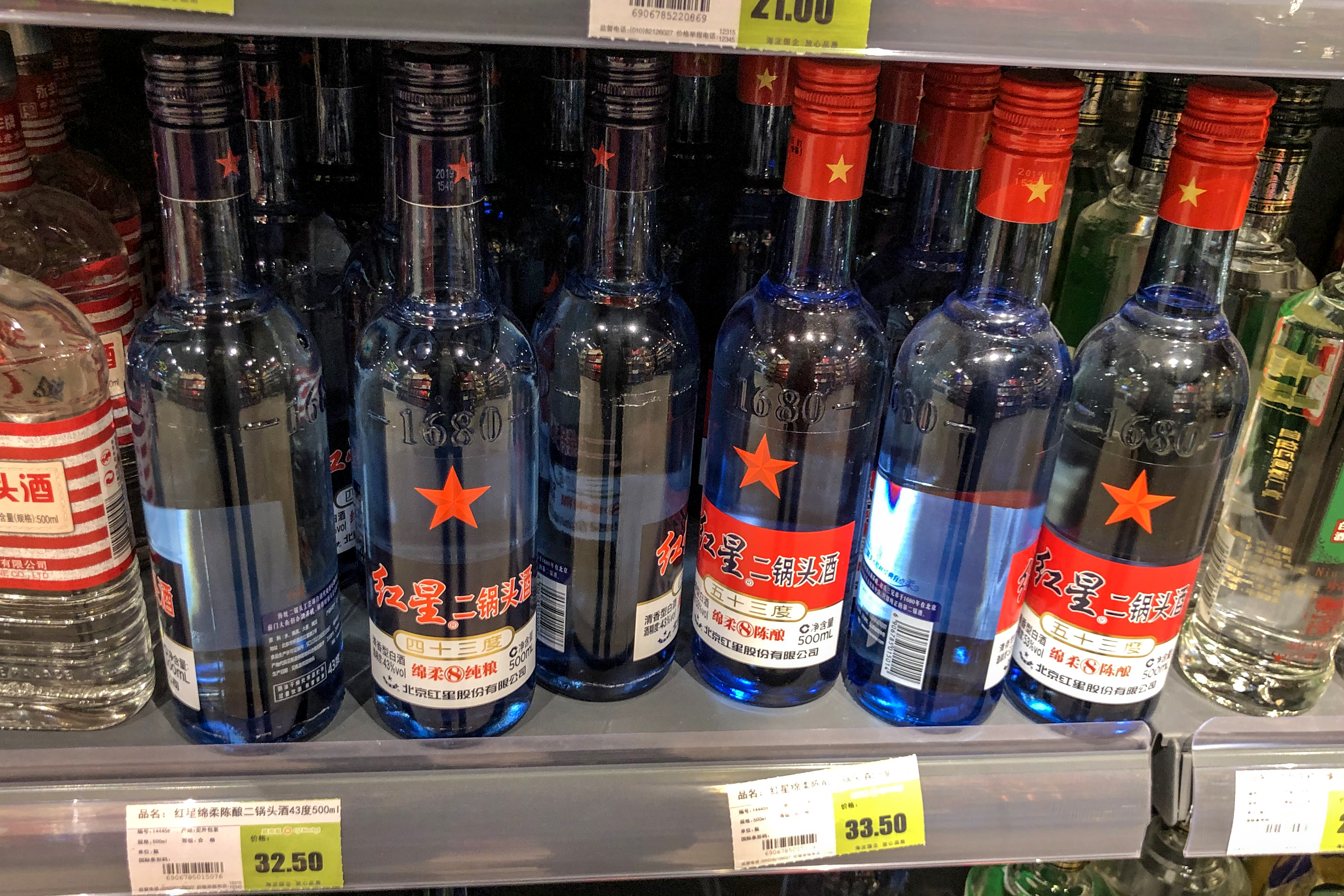
Bottles of Red Star erguotou at 53% abv.

Erguotou (Chinese: 二锅头; pinyin: èrguōtóu; lit. 'second pot head', 'i.e. second distillation') is a style of qingxiang baijiu originating in Beijing and primarily made in the region surrounding.

The process of erguotou production is what sets it apart from other qingxiang baijius like Fenjiu. Three ingredients, sorghum, fuqu (麸曲; a wheat bran based qū), and water make up the ingredient base. The sorghum is crushed, cooked, cooled, and mixed with the qū before being added, in a liquid state, to a stone or steel fermentation vessel where it will be left to ferment for a relatively short period of about four to eight days. After the qū has converted the starches and sugars in the sorghum into ethanol, the grain is transferred to a still that will extract the ethanol from the mixture. The distilled output is then rested in ceramic jars for a relatively short six to twelve months before being blended, proofed, bottled, and sold.

The relatively short fermentation time, and the stone or steel fermentation vessel result in less production of esters overall. For that reason, erguoutou is a milder spirit than other baijius in terms of aroma.

== History ==
The earliest evidence for the consumption of alcohol in the region that is now Beijing lies in the archeological discoveries of drinking vessels (Gu, Jue, and You) from the Shang and Zhou dynasties, about 3,000 years ago. However, before the Yuan dynasty, the alcohol that was being drunk came in the form of a liquid form fermented mijiu.

The first spirits in the region came with the advent of distillation around 800 years ago after which production processes were developed and expanded into a successful commercial industry. In the 1680s, during the Qing dynasty, three brothers working as heads of the Yuanshenghao distillery, experimenting with various methods of distillation discovered that their best product came while the second pot of cold water (which served as the condenser) was atop the still. It is from this discovery that the brothers developed erguotou; "head of the second pot."

This new style of baijiu gained notoriety in and around Beijing over the following centuries and so nearing the Chinese Civil War and prior to the foundation of the People's Republic, 12 distilleries in and around Beijing were nationalized and merged into a single distillery and issued the first business license in modern China, for the purpose of producing baijiu for the festivities surrounding Proclamation of the People's Republic of China. This distillery named "Hong Xing" (Chinese: 红星; lit. 'Red Star') has grown into one of the nation's most widely consumed spirits (particularly in Beijing itself) and its label, designed by a Japanese Red Army enlistee, has become one of the most iconic brands. According to baijiu writer Derek Sandhaus, Hongxing is considered "the Coca-Cola of baijius."

== See also ==
- Baijiu
- Beijing Hongxing
- Niulanshan
