= Beijing Shunyi Niulanshan First Secondary School =

Public senior high school in Shunyi, Beijing, China

Coordinates: 40.2194°N 116.65794°E

- 北京市顺义牛栏山第一中学
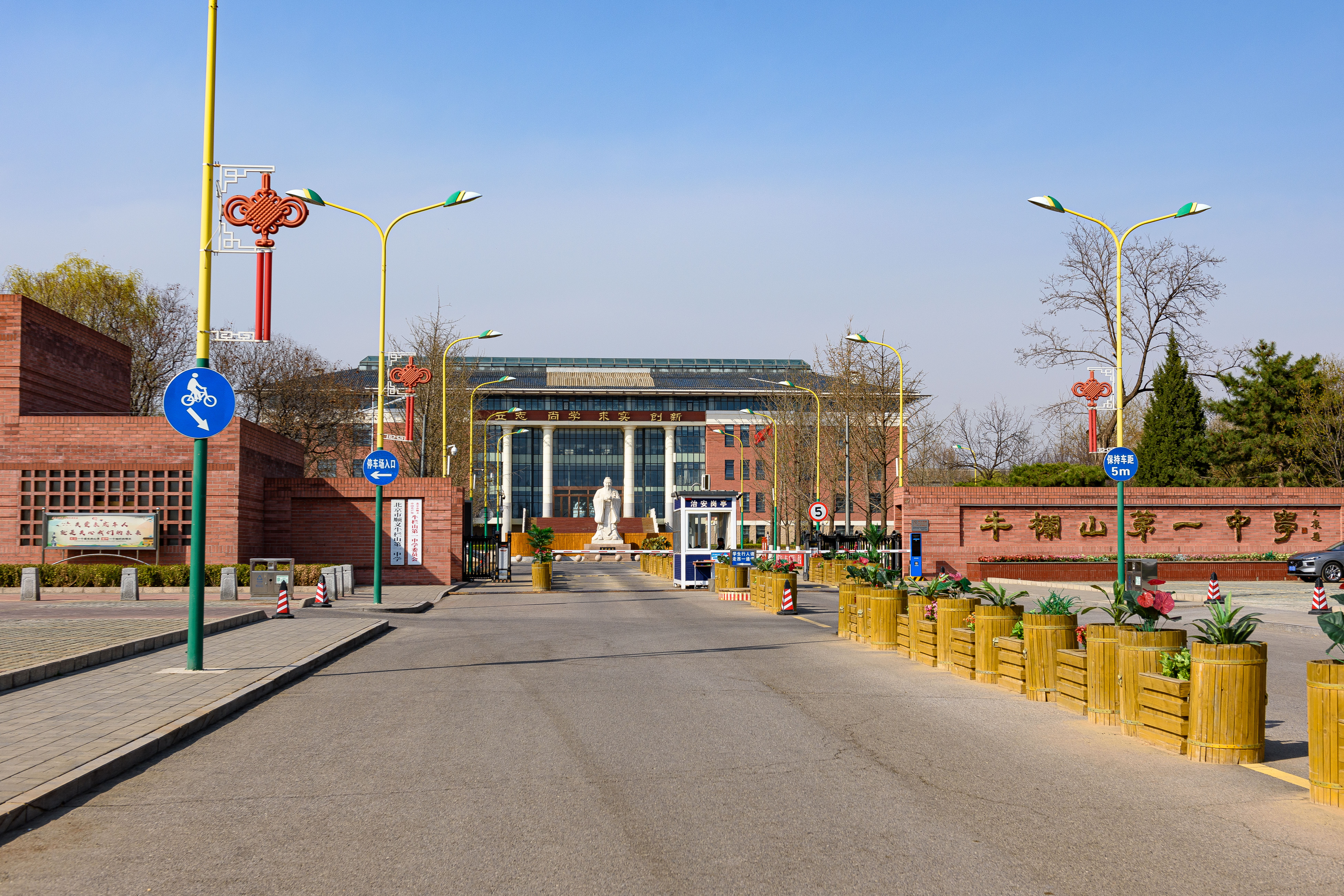
- School gate
- Beijing, China

Information
- Type: Public
- Website: Official website

Beijing Shunyi Niulanshan First Secondary School
- Simplified Chinese: 北京市顺义牛栏山第一中学
Transcriptions
Standard Mandarin
- Hanyu Pinyin: běi jīng shì shùn yì niú lán shān dì yī zhōng xué

Beijing Shunyi Niulanshan First Secondary School (Chinese: 北京市顺义牛栏山第一中学) is a public senior high school in Niulanshan Town, Shunyi, Beijing, China. The school is supervised by the Beijing City Shunyi District Education Committee.
