= Beijing Hongxing =

Chinese baijiu distillery

Beijing Hongxing 北京红星

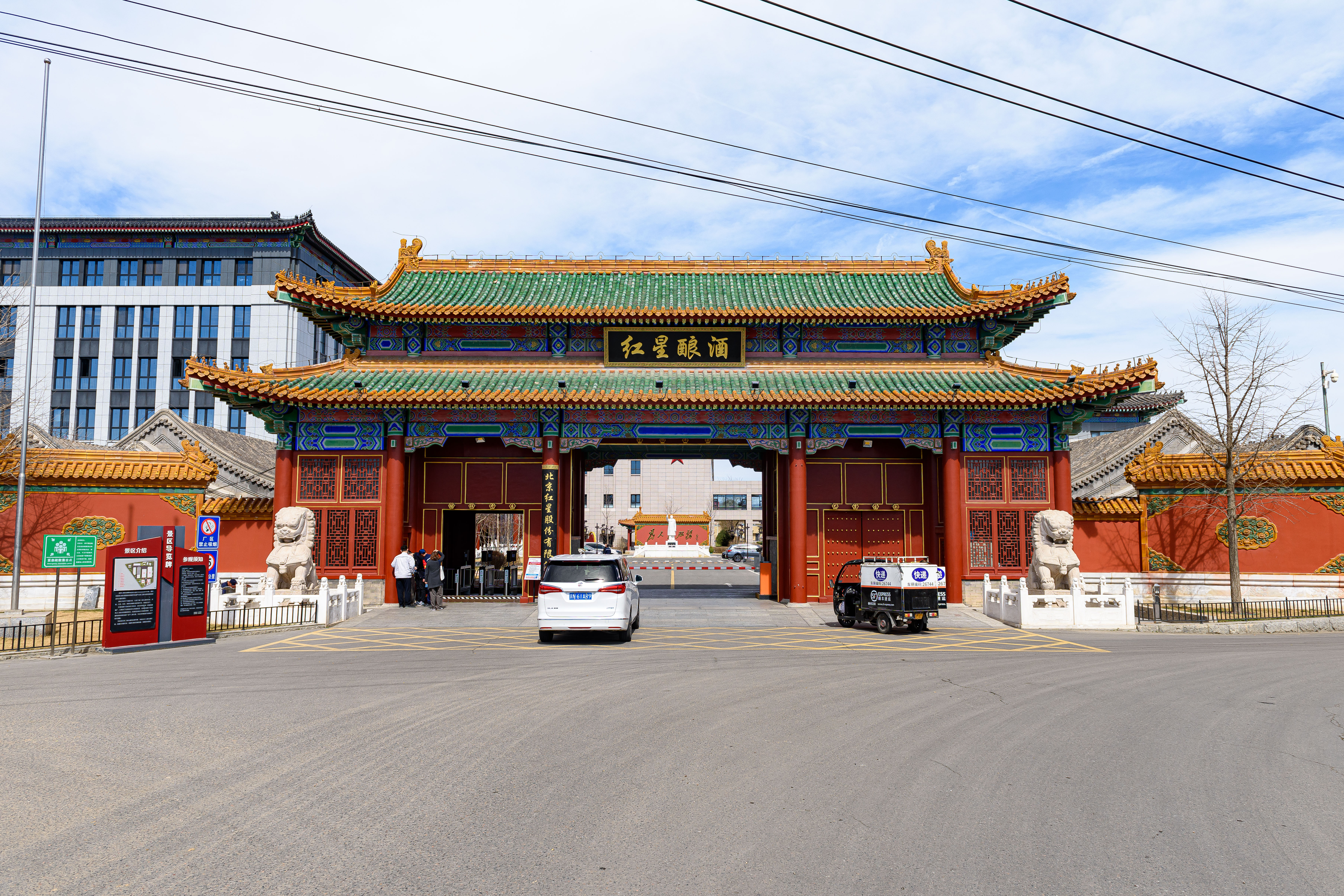
- Headquarters
- Company type: State-Owned Enterprise
- Industry: Alcoholic Beverages
- Founded: 1949; 77 years ago
- Headquarters: Beijing, China
- Area served: Worldwide
- Key people: Ji Ning (Committee Secretary)
- Products: Baijiu
- Website: redstarwine.com

Beijing Hongxing
- Simplified Chinese: 北京红星
- Traditional Chinese: 北京紅星
- Literal meaning: Beijing Red Star
Transcriptions
Standard Mandarin
- Hanyu Pinyin: běi jīng hóng xīng
- Wade–Giles: bei^{3} ching^{1} hung^{2} hsing^{1}

Beijing Hongxing Co. Ltd (Chinese: 北京红星股份有限公司), commonly known as "Hongxing" (Chinese: 红星; lit. 'Red Star') is a baijiu distillery in Beijing, China. The distillery is best known for producing an iconic, low-cost erguotou baijiu, a variety of qingxiang (清香; "light aroma") baijiu which is the most popular baijiu sold in the Chinese capital city.

== History ==
The origin of erguotou dates back to 1680 when the three Zhou brothers, as the heads of the Yuanshenghao distillery, developed the technique after noticing that as the condenser of the still needed cooling, it was the product resulting from the second of three pots of cooling water that produced the finest product. It was after this process that the style was named "Er-Guo-Tou"(二锅头; "Second-Pot-Head").

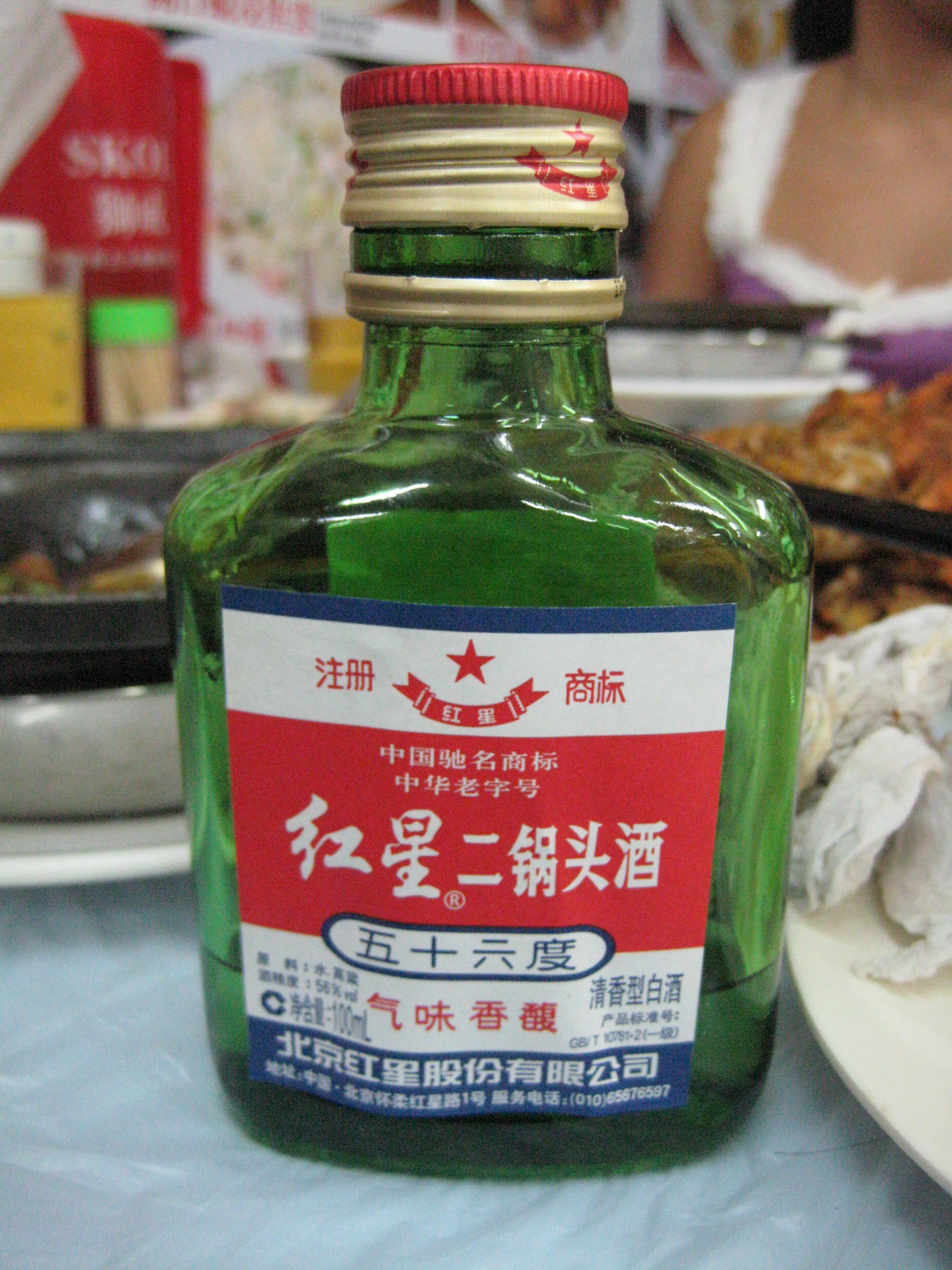
A bottle of "Xiao Er"

During the Chinese Civil War the seeds of Beijing Hongxing were sewn when the People's Republic banned the private production and sale of liquor and implemented a state monopoly on production. In May of that year, the "North China Liquor Company" (later renamed Beijing Distillery) was founded, merging 12 distilleries in the region, become the first state owned distillery in the newly founded People's Republic, and becoming the sole legal producer of erguotou baijiu. The first batch of erguotou was produced in September and named Hong Xing (红星;"Red Star") in honor of the founding of the republic. The soon to be iconic label was designed by a Japanese Red Army enlistee named Sakurai. Hongxing became one of the first trademarks registered in the nation in 1951 and demand for the drink only grew. In 1965, in an attempt to keep up with demand, and to keep prices low and accessible in accordance with the directions of then premier, Zhou Enlai Beijing Honxing took over management of 19 distilleries in the surrounding region where production of erguotou baijiu could be expanded into. Eventually, Beijing Hongxing relinquished the trademark for the exclusive use of the term "erguotou" in 1981. Throughout these years however, Beijing Hongxing retains the legacy of the Zhou brothers that had originally developed erguotou as Ai Jinzhong, the 9th generation descendent of the Zhou brothers serves as director of production.

Today Beijing Hongxing continues to hold an iconic place in Chinese drinking culture and due to its low cost is seen as a popular working class spirit.
