= Niulanshan, Beijing =

Niulanshan Town 牛栏山镇
- Town
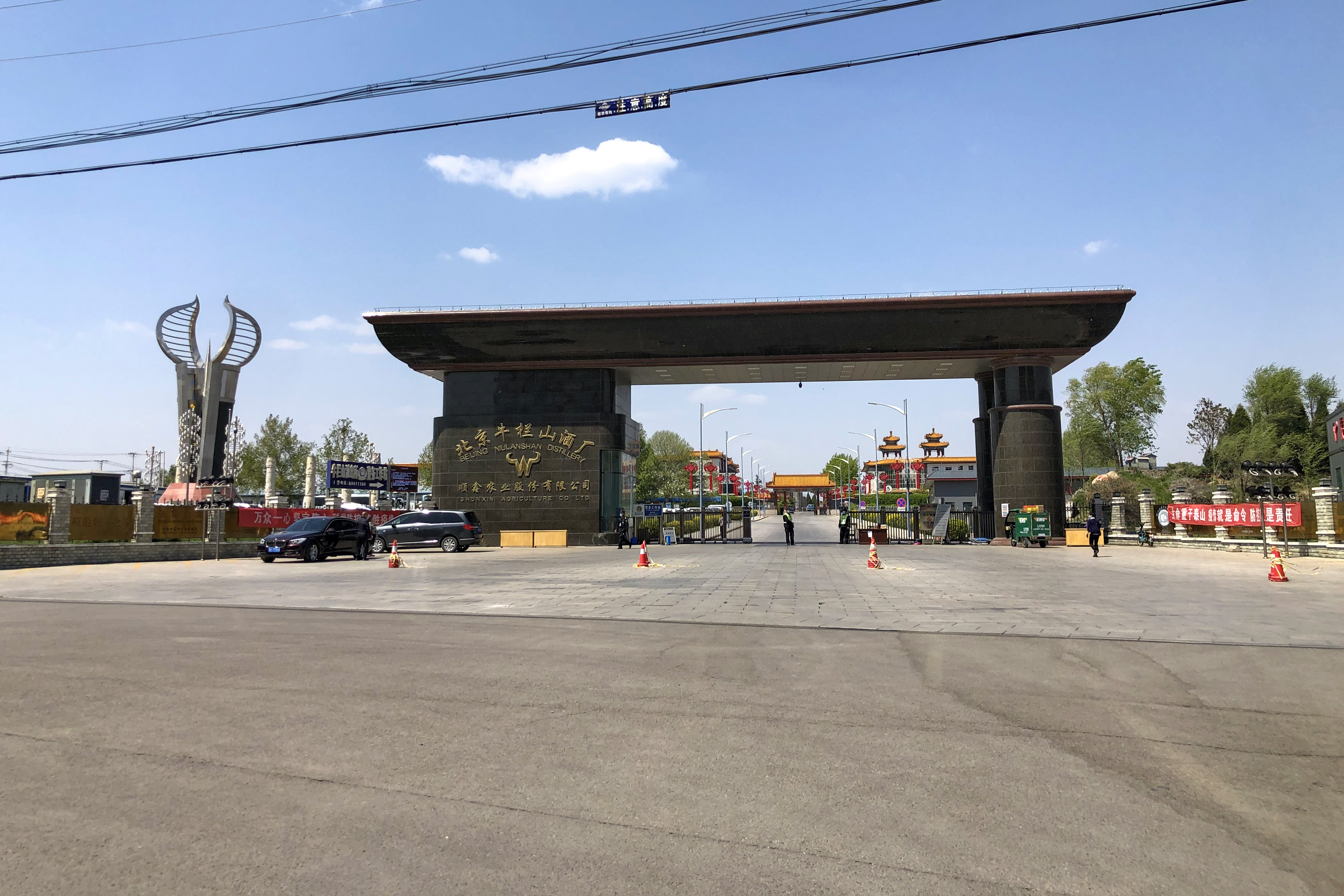
- Headquarter of Niulanshan Distillery, 2020

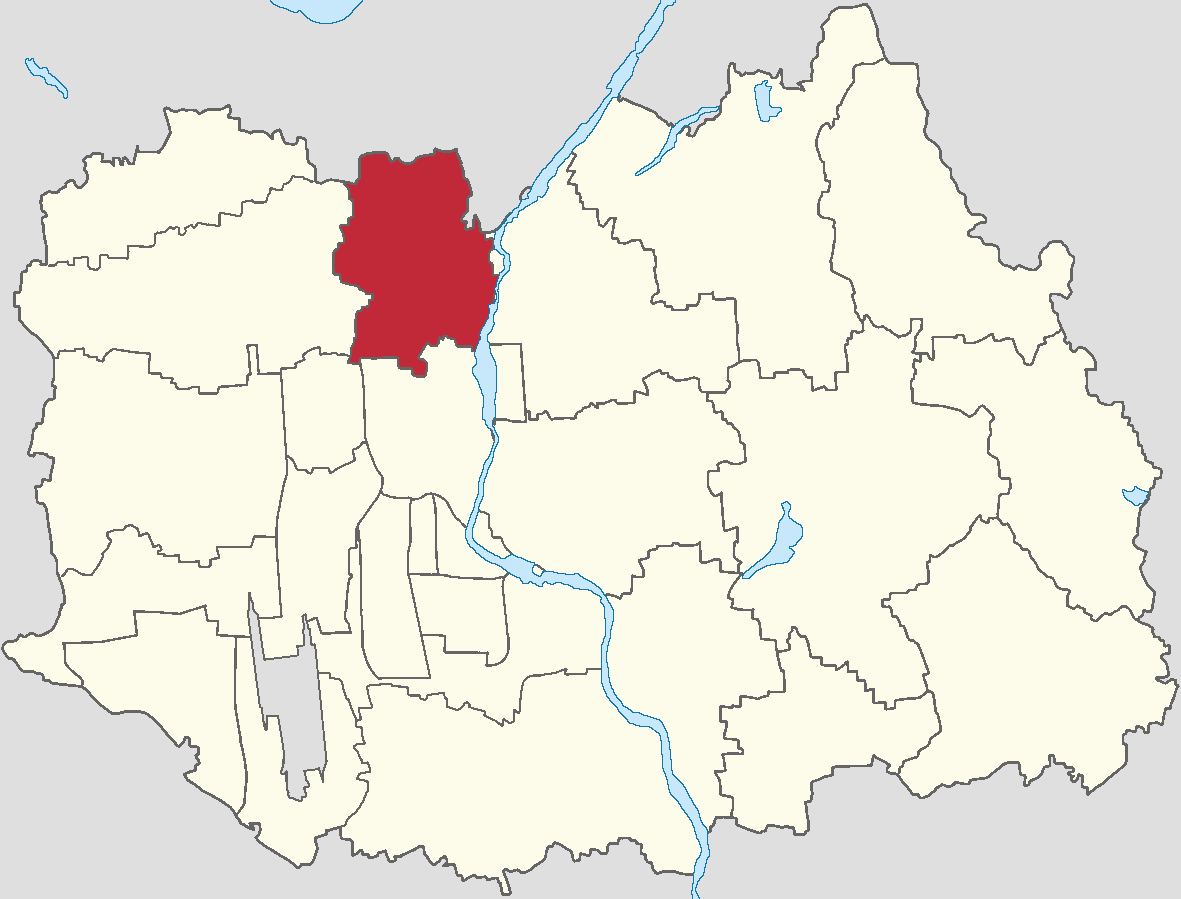
- Location of Niulanshan Town within Shunyi District

- Location within Beijing Location within China
- Coordinates: 40°12′36″N 116°38′55″E
- Country: China
- Municipality: Beijing
- District: Shunyi
- Village-level Divisions: 6 communities 20 villages

Area
  - Total: 36.91 km^{2} (14.25 sq mi)
- Elevation: 41 m (135 ft)

Population (2020)
  - Total: 54,687
  - Density: 1,482/km^{2} (3,837/sq mi)
- Time zone: UTC+8 (China Standard)
- Postal code: 101301
- Area code: 010

Niulanshan Town (Chinese: 牛栏山镇; pinyin: Niúlánshān Zhèn) is a town in the northern siden of Shunyi District, Beijing, China. It shares border with Miaocheng and Yangsong Towns in its north, Beixiaoying Town in its east, Shuangfeng Subdistrict and Mapo Town in its south, and Zhaoquanying Town in its west. Its total population was 54,687 as of 2020.

== History ==
Timetable of Niulanshan Town
Year	Status	Under
1949–1956	2nd District	Shunyi County
1956–1958	Zhongxin Township	Shunyi County
1958–1983	Niulanshan People's Commune	Shunyi County
1983–1989	Niulanshan Township	Shunyi County
1989–1998	Niulanshan Town	Shunyi County
1998–2000	Niulanshan Area	Shunyi District
2000–present	Niulanshan Area (Niulanshan Town)	Shunyi District

== Administrative divisions ==
At the end of 2021, Niulanshan had direct jurisdiction over 26 subdivisions, including 6 communities and 20 villages:

Administrative division code	Subdivision names	Name transliteration	Type
110113007004	牛栏山第一	Niulanshan Diyi	Community
110113007005	香醍漫步	Xiangti Manbu	Community
110113007006	香醍溪岸	Xiangti Xi'an	Community
110113007007	好望山	Haowangshan	Community
110113007008	安纳湖	Annahu	Community
110113007009	赢麓家园	Yinglu Jiayuan	Community
110113007201	北孙各庄	Bei Sungezhuang	Village
110113007202	龙王头	Longwangtou	Village
110113007203	富各庄	Fugezhuang	Village
110113007204	北军营	Beijunying	Village
110113007205	芦正卷村	Luzhengjuan Cun	Village
110113007206	相各庄	Xianggezhuang	Village
110113007207	官志卷	Guanzhijuan	Village
110113007208	东范各庄村	Dong Fanggezhuang Cun	Village
110113007209	后晏子	Hou Yanzi	Village
110113007210	前晏子	Qian Yanzi	Village
110113007211	兰家营村	Lanjiaying Cun	Village
110113007212	姚各庄	Yaogezhuang	Village
110113007213	半壁店	Banbidian	Village
110113007214	张家庄	Zhangjiazhuang	Village
110113007215	下坡屯	Xiapotun	Village
110113007216	史家口	Shijiakou	Village
110113007217	金牛	Jinniu	Village
110113007218	先进	Xianjin	Village
110113007219	禾丰	Hefeng	Village
110113007220	安乐	Anle	Village

== Gallery ==
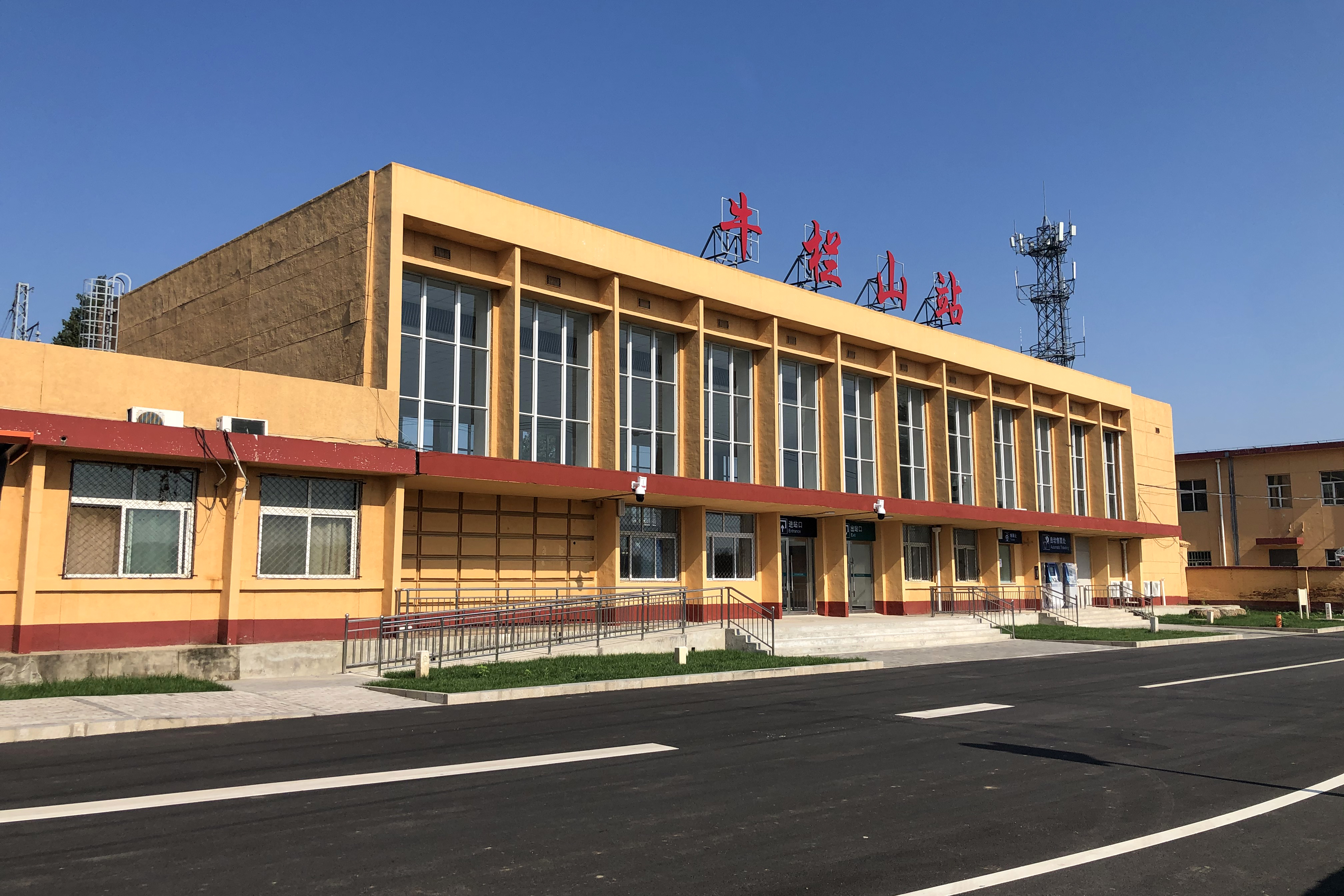
Niulanshan Railway Station, 2020

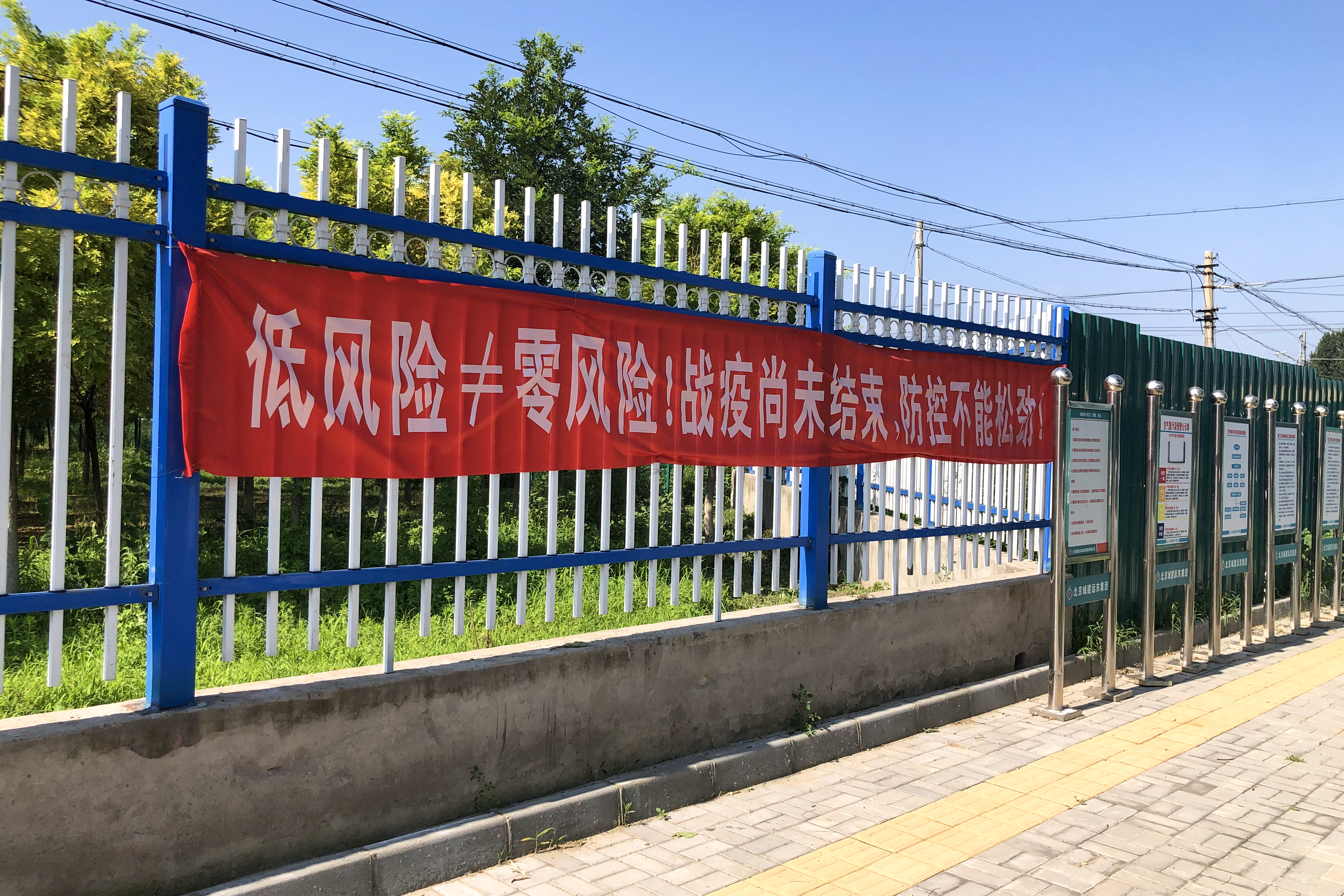
Anti-COVID banner within the town, 2020

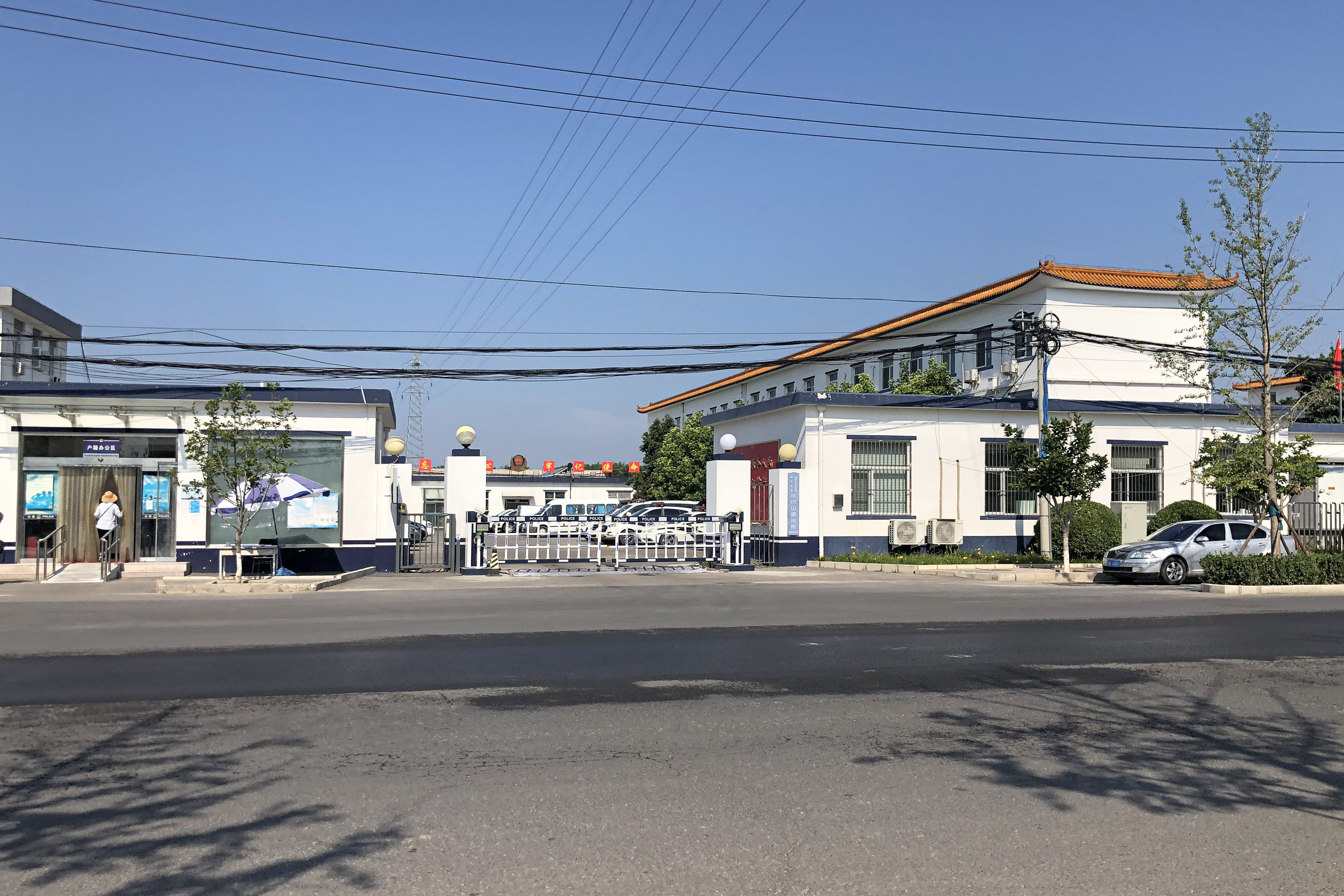
Niulanshan Police Station, 2020

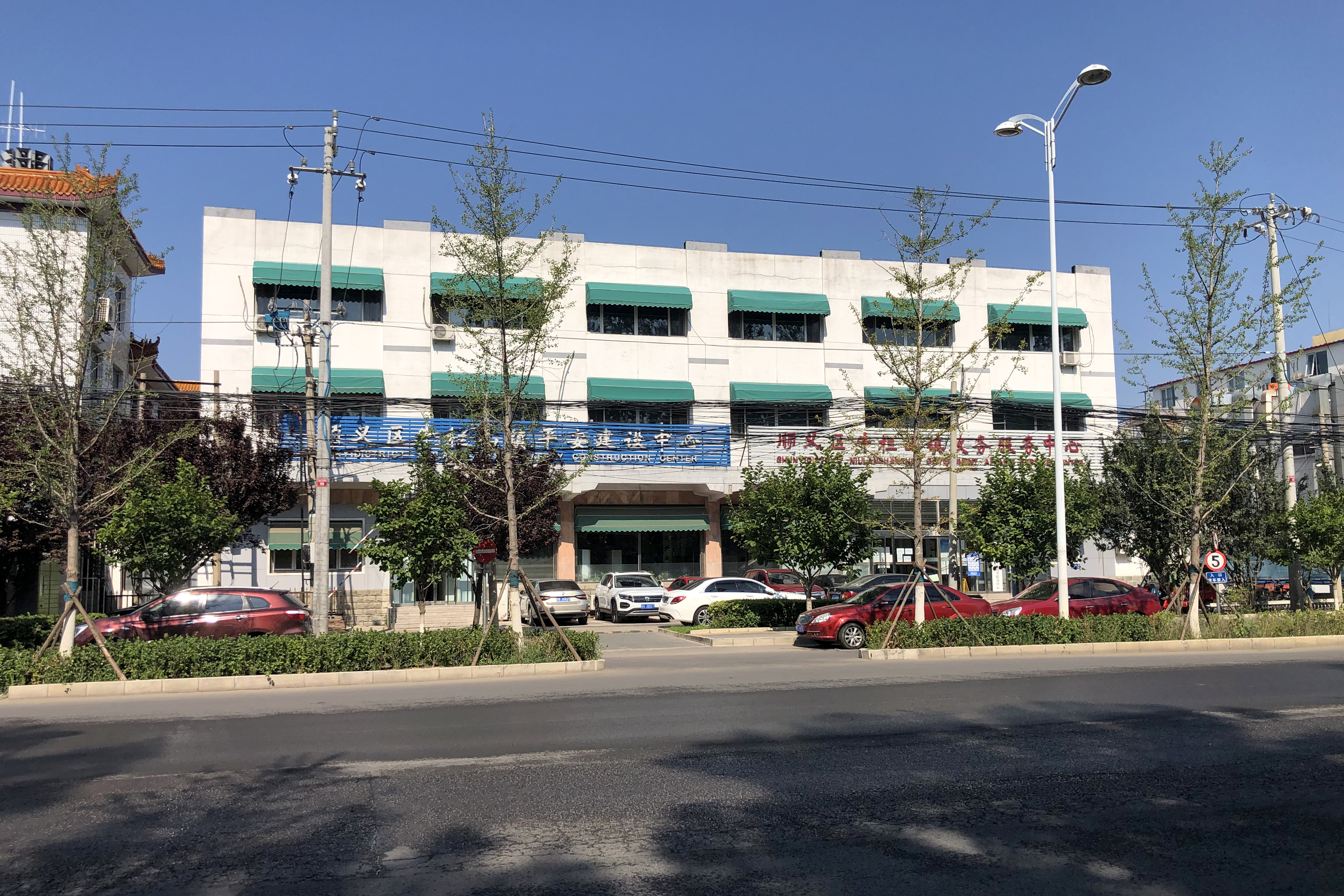
Niulanshan Government Affairs Service Center, 2020

== See also ==
- List of township-level divisions of Beijing
- Niulanshan No.1 High School
